= 1830s =

Decade

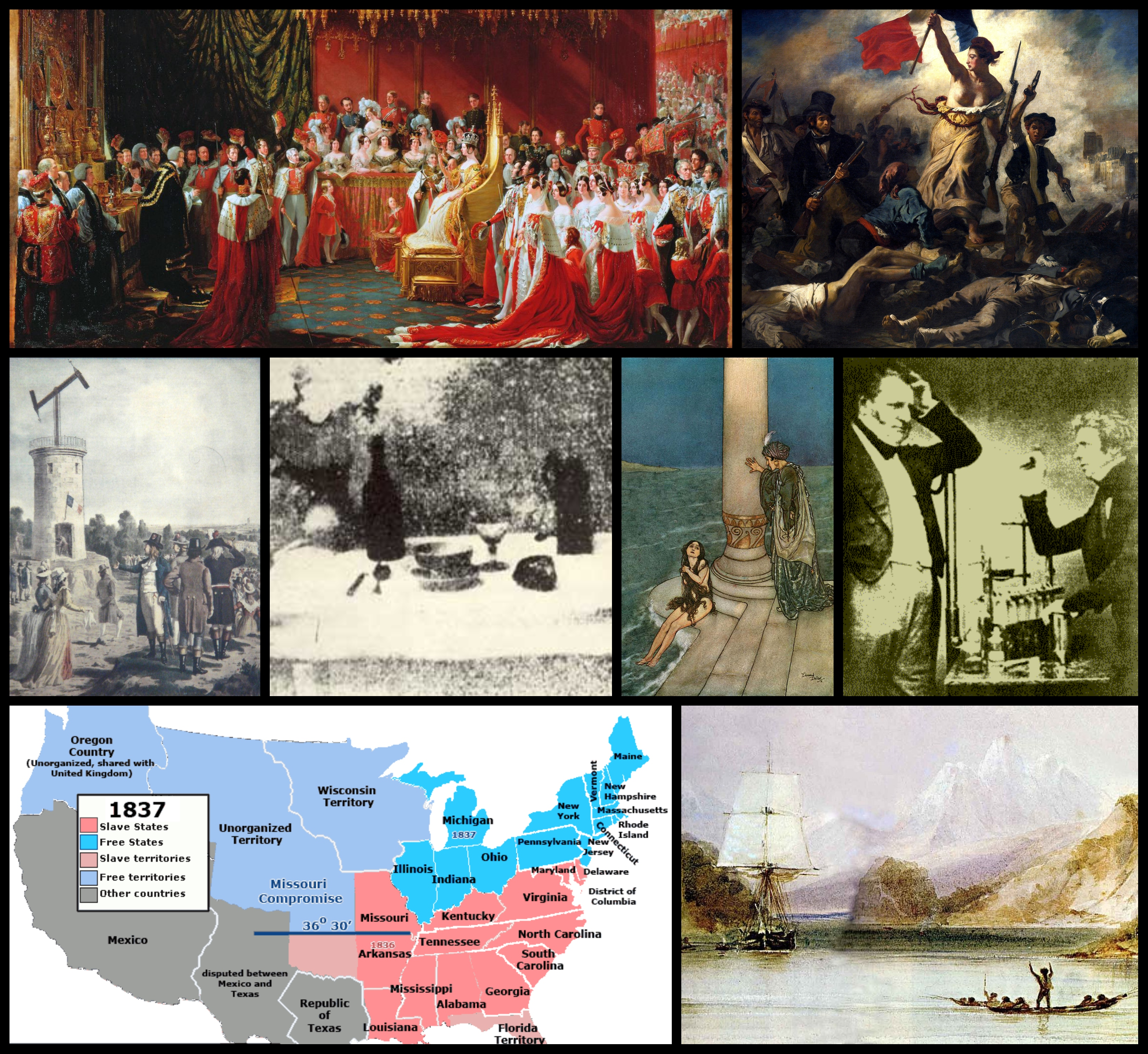
From top left, clockwise: The coronation of Queen Victoria marked the beginning of her 64-year long reign. Her reign meant the revival of the British Empire, as the United Kingdom rapidly grew powerful territorially and economically. Under her rule, Britain saw a massive upheaval of colonial power, as over a quarter of the world fell into British rule; France's 1830 revolution reinstated liberal values – and later French imperialism – back into French governance and power. The revolution resulted in the dethroning of King Charles X and indirectly rebirthed the French colonial empire; Michael Faraday and John Daniell's studies helped form the basis of electrochemistry via the discovery of electromagnetic induction. Their discoveries moulded a huge part of contemporary chemistry, and forever changed the way people utilized electricity; HMS Beagle circumnavigates the world twice. Its second expedition with Charles Darwin has proven to be particularly pioneering, as the discoveries and theories he made on said voyage, helped him develop the theory of evolution, widely enhanced scientific consensus and knowledge on taxonomy and biology, and birthed the concept of natural selection. Slave and free states grow in number and power; a dynamic movement widely perceived as a prelude to the American Civil War as abolishment and establishment began to socio-politically polarize the United States' society, subsequently forming Union and Confederate states. The telegraph is invented by Samuel Morse. His patent opened the world to global networking and broke long distances as boundaries with it – the first of its kind; an 1832 still-life image developed by a daguerreotype. The daguerreotype was first introduced to the public in 1839. Its release made it the first invention that enabled the public to capture images on a recurrent basis – a move that would eventually nurture the growth of modern-day photography; Hans Christian Andersen publishes his first collection of fairy tales in 1837. His publications profoundly transformed literature, and grew to become one of the most popular and influential storywriters of the 19th century, with stories like The Little Mermaid (as pictured), and Thumbelina; a legacy that today retains as Denmark's national icon.

The 1830s (pronounced "eighteen-thirties") was the decade that began on January 1, 1830, and ended on December 31, 1839.

In this decade, the world saw a rapid rise in imperialism and colonialism, particularly in Asia and Africa. Britain saw a surge of power and world dominance, as Queen Victoria took to the throne in 1837. Conquests took place all over the world, particularly around the expansion of the Ottoman Empire and the British Raj. New outposts and settlements flourished in Oceania, as Europeans began to settle over Australia, New Zealand, Canada and the United States.

== Politics ==
=== Pacific ===
- 1830 – John Williams brings Protestant Christianity to Samoa.
- July 30, 1836 – The first English language newspaper is published in Hawaii.
- 1838 – The Pitcairn Islands become a Crown colony of the United Kingdom; and women there are the first in the world to be granted, and maintain, women's suffrage.

=== East Asia ===
==== China ====
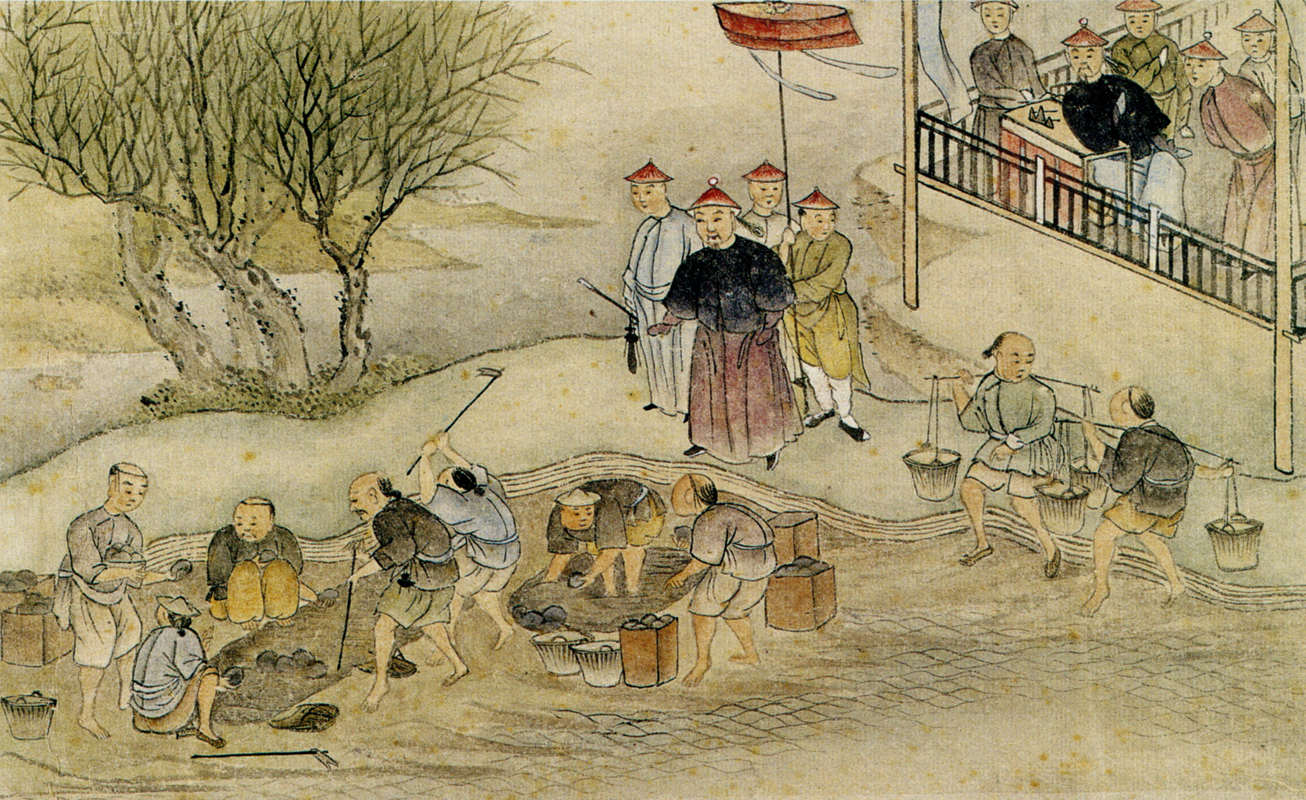
Lin Zexu supervising the destruction of opium in 1839

China was ruled by the Daoguang Emperor of the Qing dynasty during the 1830s. The decade witnessed a rapid rise in the sale of opium in China, despite efforts by the Daoguang Emperor to end the trade. A turning point came in 1834, with the end of the monopoly of the East India Company, leaving trade in the hands of private entrepreneurs. By 1838, opium sales climbed to 40,000 chests. In 1839, newly appointed imperial commissioner Lin Zexu banned the sale of opium and imposed several restrictions on all foreign traders. Lin also closed the channel to Guangzhou (Canton), leading to the seizure and destruction of 20,000 chests of opium. The British retaliated, seizing Hong Kong on August 23 of that year, starting what would be known as the First Opium War. It would end three years later with the signing of the Treaty of Nanking in 1842, signed by Keying and Yilibu on behalf of the Daoguang Emperor, and Henry Pottinger on behalf of Queen Victoria. The Treaty was based heavily on the earlier Convention of Chuenpi, signed by Qishan and Charles Elliot

==== Japan ====
- July 1837 – Charles W. King sets sail on the American merchant ship Morrison. In the Morrison incident, he is turned away from Japanese ports with cannon fire.

=== South-eastern Asia ===
- March 28, 1830 – The Java War ends.
- 1833 – H.R.H. Prince Mongkut of Siam founds the Dhammayut Buddhist reform movement.

==== Dutch East Indies ====
The Padri War was fought from 1803 until 1837 in West Sumatra between the Padris and the Adats. The latter asked for the help of the Dutch, who intervened from 1821 and helped the Adats defeat the Padri faction. The conflict intensified in the 1830s, as the war soon centered on Bonjol, the fortified last stronghold of the Padris. It finally fell in 1837 after being besieged for three years, and along with the exile of Padri leader Tuanku Imam Bonjol, the conflict died out.

==== Vietnam ====
- 1831–1834 – Siamese–Vietnamese War for Cambodia and Southern Vietnam.
- 1839 – The Emperor Minh Mạng renames Việt Nam to Đại Nam.

==== Brunei and Sarawak ====
- 1836 – The Sarawak Uprising of 1836 began.

=== Australia and New Zealand ===
- August 15, 1834 – The South Australia Act allows for the creation of a colony there.
- June 8, 1835 – The Australian city of Melbourne is founded by John Batman and John Pascoe Fawkner.
- October 28, 1835 – United Tribes of New Zealand founded at Waitangi with the Declaration of the Independence of New Zealand.
- November 19, 1835 – A force of 500 Māori people invade, massacre, eat and enslave the Moriori people of the Chatham Islands.
- July 27, 1836 – Adelaide, is founded.
- December 26, 1836 – The Colony of South Australia, founded by Captain John Hindmarsh, is officially proclaimed (now celebrated in the state of South Australia as Proclamation Day).
- June 10, 1838 – 28 Indigenous Australians are killed in the Myall Creek massacre.

=== Southern Asia ===
- December 1838 – First Anglo-Afghan War: British and Presidency armies set out from Punjab in support of Shah Shujah Durrani's claim to the throne of Afghanistan.

==== India ====
The British government appointed a series of administrative heads of British India in the 1830s ("Governor-General of India" starting in 1833): Lord William Bentinck (1828–1835), Sir Charles Metcalfe, Bt (1835–1836), and The Lord Auckland (1836–1842). The Government of India Act 1833 was enacted to remove the East India Company's remaining trade monopolies and divested it of all its commercial functions, renewing the company's political and administrative authority for another twenty years. It invested the Board of Control with full power and authority over the company.

The English Education Act by the Council of India in 1835 reallocated funds from the East India Company to spend on education and literature in India. In 1837, the British East India company replaced Persian with local vernacular in various provinces as the official and court language. However, in the northern regions of the Indian subcontinent, Urdu instead of Hindi was chosen to replace Persian.

In 1835, William Henry Sleeman captured "Feringhea" in his efforts to suppress the Thuggee secret society. Sleeman's work led to his appointment as General Superintendent of the operations for the Suppression of Thuggee. In February 1839, he assumed charge of the office of Commissioner for the Suppression of Thuggee and Dacoity. During these operations, more than 1400 Thugs were hanged or transported for life.

=== Western Asia ===
- 1831 – Muhammad Ali of Egypt's French-trained forces occupy Syria.
- May 10, 1832 – The Egyptians, aided by Maronites, seize Acre from the Ottoman Empire after a 7-month siege.
- December 21, 1832 – Battle of Konya: The Egyptians defeat the main Ottoman army in central Anatolia.
- September 1, 1836 – Rebuilding begins at the Hurva Synagogue in Jerusalem.
- January 19, 1839 – The East India Company captures Aden.
- July 23, 1839 – First Anglo-Afghan War, Battle of Ghazni: British forces capture the fortress city of Ghazni, Afghanistan.

=== Eastern Europe ===
==== Poland ====
- November 29, 1830 – The November Uprising begins in Warsaw against Russian rule.
- February 20, 1831 – Battle of Olszynka Grochowska: Polish rebel forces divide a Russian army.
- May 26, 1831 – Battle of Ostrołęka: The Poles fight another indecisive battle.
- September 6 – September 8, 1831 – Battle of Warsaw: The Russians take the Polish capital and crush resistance.

=== Northern Europe ===
==== United Kingdom ====
===== Royalty =====
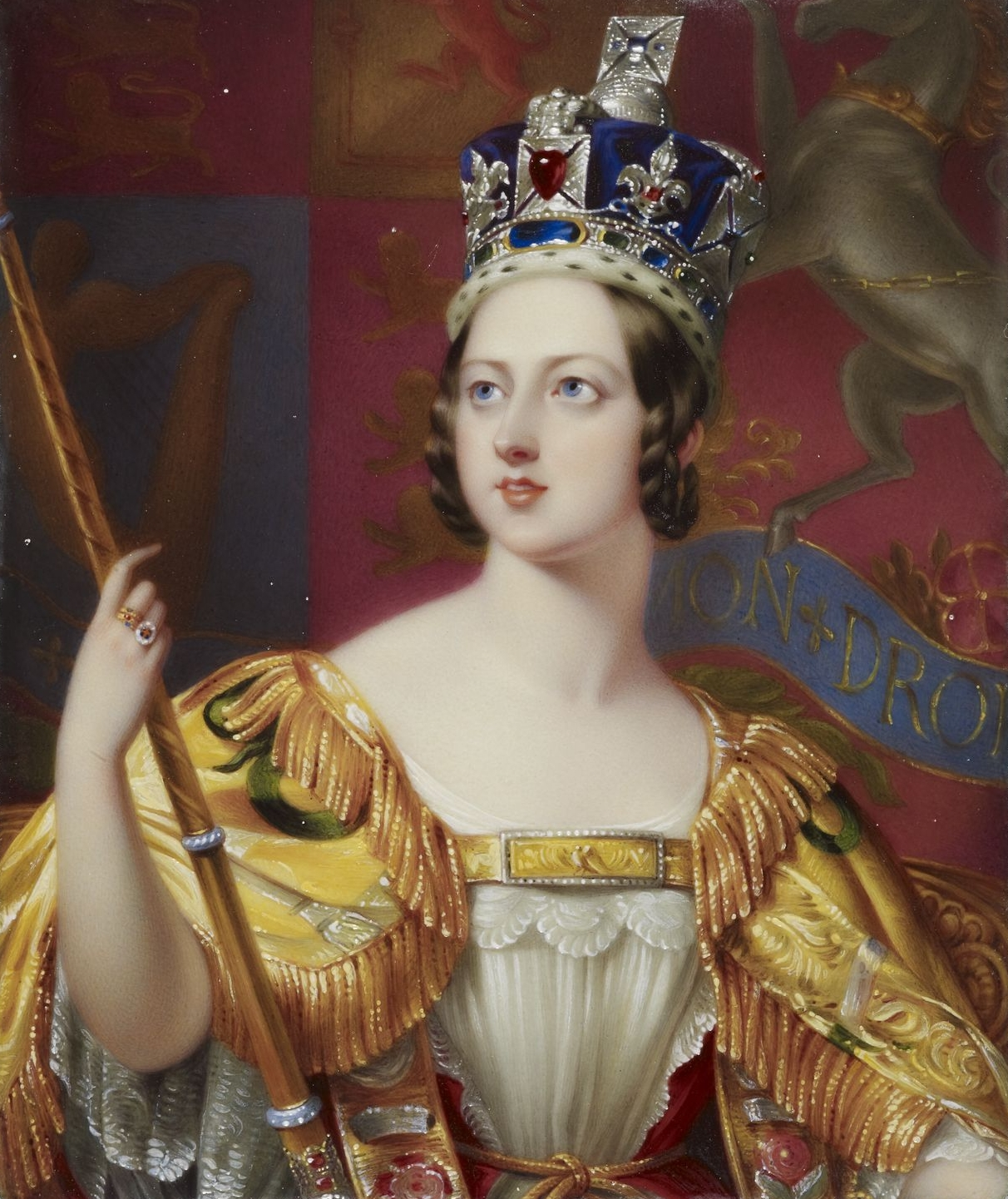
June 20: Queen Victoria, Queen of the United Kingdom (1837–1901).

In 1830, William IV succeeded his brother George IV as King of the United Kingdom. Upon his death in 1837, his 18-year-old niece, Princess Victoria. Under Salic law, the Kingdom of Hanover passed to William's brother, Ernest Augustus, Duke of Cumberland, ending the personal union of Britain and Hanover which had existed since 1714. Queen Victoria took up residence in Buckingham Palace, the first reigning British monarch to make this, rather than St James's Palace, her London home.

===== Politics and law =====
Britain had four prime ministers during the 1830s. As the decade began, Tory Arthur Wellesley, 1st Duke of Wellington led parliament. Wellington's government fell in late 1830, failing to react to calls for reform. The Whigs selected Charles Grey, 2nd Earl Grey to succeed him, who led passage of many reforms, including the Reform Act 1832, the Slavery Abolition Act 1833 (abolishing slavery throughout the British Empire), and the Factory Acts (limiting child labour).

In 1834 Grey retired from public life, leaving Lord Melbourne as his successor. Reforms continued under Lord Melbourne, with the Poor Law Amendment Act in 1834, which stated that no able-bodied British man could receive assistance unless he entered a workhouse. King William IV's opposition to the Whigs' reforming ways led him to dismiss Melbourne in November and then appoint Sir Robert Peel to form a Tory government. Peel's failure to win a House of Commons majority in the resulting general election (January 1835) made it impossible for him to govern, and the Whigs returned to power under Melbourne in April 1835. The Marriage Act 1836 established civil marriage and registration systems that permit marriages in nonconformist chapels, and a Registrar General of Births, Marriages, and Deaths.

There were protests and significant unrest during the decade. In May and June 1831 in Wales, coal miners and others rioted for improved working conditions in what was known as the Merthyr Rising. William Howley Archbishop of Canterbury has his coach attacked by an angry mob on his first official visit to Canterbury in 1832. In 1834, Robert Owen organized the Grand National Consolidated Trades Union, an early attempt to form a national union confederation. In May 1838, the People's Charter was drawn up in the United Kingdom, demanding universal suffrage. Chartism continued to gain popularity, leading to the Newport Rising in 1839, the last large-scale armed rebellion against authority in mainland Britain.

In 1835, James Pratt and John Smith were hanged outside Newgate Prison in London after a conviction of sodomy, the last deadly victims of the judicial persecution of homosexual men in England.

=== Western Europe ===
==== Germany ====
- May 30, 1832 – Germany: Hambacher Festival, a demonstration for civil liberties and national unity, ends with no result.
- December 14, 1833 – Kaspar Hauser, a mysterious German youth, is stabbed, dying three days later on December 17.
- January 1, 1834 – Zollverein: Customs charges are abolished at borders within Germany.
- October 13, 1836 – Theodor Fliedner, a Lutheran minister, and Friederike, his wife, open the Deaconess Home and Hospital at Kaiserswerth, Germany, as an institute to train women in nursing.
- 1837 – The 5th century BC Berlin Foundry Cup is acquired for the Antikensammlung Berlin in Germany.

==== Austria ====
- March 2, 1835 – Ferdinand becomes Emperor of Austria.

==== Switzerland ====
- October, 1830 – Start of the Regeneration in Switzerland: more liberal constitutions adopted in most cantons.
- August 3, 1833 – In Switzerland, troops of the city of Basel march on rebels in Liestal, but are beaten back at the Battle of Hülftenschanz.
- August 26, 1833 – The Canton of Basel is partitioned by the Swiss Tagsatzung, to create the two half-cantons of Basel-City and Basel-Country.

==== Belgium ====
- August 25, 1830 – The Belgian Revolution begins.
- September 27, 1830 – The Belgian Revolution ends by liberating Brussels from the United Kingdom of the Netherlands.
- October 4, 1830 – The Provisional Government in Brussels declares the creation of the independent state of Belgium, in revolt against the United Kingdom of the Netherlands.
- December 20, 1830 – The independence of Belgium is recognized by the Great Powers.
- July 21, 1831 – Leopold I of Belgium is inaugurated as first king of the Belgians.
- August 2, 1831 – The Dutch ten days' campaign in Belgium is halted by a French army.
- December 4, 1832 – Battle of Antwerp: The last remaining Dutch enforcement, the citadel, is under French attack.
- December 23, 1832 – The Battle of Antwerp ends with the Netherlands losing the city.
- 1839 – Half of the Limburg province of Belgium is added to the Netherlands (since 1839 there is a Belgian Limburg and Dutch Limburg).
- April 19, 1839 – The Treaty of London establishes Belgium as a kingdom.

==== France ====
French Revolution of 1830

===== French Revolution of 1830 =====
The French Revolution of 1830 was also known as the July Revolution, Second French Revolution or Trois Glorieuses in French. It saw the overthrow of King Charles X, the French Bourbon monarch, and the ascent of his brother Louis, Duke of Orléans (who would in turn be overthrown in 1848). The revolution ended the Bourbon Restoration, shifting power to the July Monarchy (rule by the House of Orléans). Duc de Broglie briefly served as State Minister, with many successors over the course of 2 years.

===== Canut revolts =====
The first two Canut revolts occurred in the 1830s. They were among the first well-defined worker uprisings of the Industrial Revolution. The word Canut was a common term to describe to all Lyonnais silk workers.

The First Canut revolt in 1831 was provoked by a drop in workers' wages caused by a drop in silk prices. After a bloody battle with the military causing 600 casualties, rebellious silk workers seize Lyon, France. The government sent Marshal Jean-de-Dieu Soult, a veteran of the Napoleonic Wars, at the head of an army of 20,000 to restore order. Soult was able to retake the town without any bloodshed, and without making any compromises with the workers. The Second Canut revolt in 1834 occurred when owners attempted to impose a wage decrease. The government crushed the rebellion in a bloody battle, and deported or imprisoned 10,000 insurgents.

===== Other events =====
- June 5 – 6, 1832 – France: June Rebellion, anti-monarchist riots, chiefly by students, in Paris.
- 1835 – The French word for their language changes to français, from françois.

=== Southern Europe ===
==== Ottoman Empire (Balkans) ====
- March 29, 1831 – The Great Bosnian uprising against the Ottoman Empire breaks out.
- April, 1839 – Sultan Mahmud II of the Ottoman Empire dies.
- July 1, 1839 – Abdülmecid I (1839–1861) succeeds Mahmud II (1808–1839) as Ottoman Emperor.
- 1839 – The United Kingdom of Great Britain and Ireland, backed by the Russian Empire and the Austrian Empire, compels July Monarchy France to abandon Muhammad Ali of Egypt, and it forces him to return Syria and Arabia to the Ottoman Empire.
- November 3, 1839 – Tanzimat starts in the Ottoman Empire.

==== Greece ====
- February 3, 1830 – Greece is liberated from the Ottoman forces as the final result of the Greek War of Independence.
- July 20, 1830 – Greece grants citizenship to Jews.
- May 7, 1832 – The Treaty of London creates an independent Kingdom of Greece. Otto of Wittelsbach, Prince of Bavaria, is chosen King. Thus begins the history of modern Greece.
- May 11, 1832 – Greece is recognized as a sovereign nation; the Treaty of Constantinople ends the Greek War of Independence in July.
- 1833 – Greece recaptures the Acropolis.
- June 7, 1834 – Greek independence: General Theodoros Kolokotronis is sentenced to death for treason for resisting the rule of Otto of Greece (he is released next year).
- 1834 – Athens becomes Greece's capital city.

==== Italian Peninsula ====
- November 8, 1830 – Ferdinand II becomes King of the Two Sicilies.
- February–March 1831 – Revolts in Modena, Parma and the Papal States are put down by Austrian troops.
- April 27, 1831 – Charles Albert becomes king of Sardinia after the death of King Charles Felix.
- 1834 – A pro-republic uprising fails in Piedmont; one of the activists is Giuseppe Garibaldi.
- October 3, 1839 – In the Kingdom of the Two Sicilies, a railway between Naples and Portici (7.4 km length) is inaugurated by H.M. King Ferdinand II of Bourbon (the first railway in the Italian peninsula).

==== Spain ====
- September 29, 1833 – Three-year-old Isabella II becomes Queen of Spain, under the regency of her mother, Maria Cristina of Bourbon-Two Sicilies. Her uncle Don Carlos, Conde de Molina challenges her claim, beginning the First Carlist War.
- July 15, 1834 – The Spanish Inquisition, which began in the 15th century, is suppressed by royal decree.
- September 19, 1837 – Battle of Aranzueque: Liberal victory for the forces loyal to Queen Isabella II of Spain, end of the Carlist campaign known as the Expedición Real – The First Carlist War.
- October 1, 1838 – Supporters of Infante Carlos, Count of Molina, are victorious in the Battle of Maella during the First Carlist War.
- August 31, 1839 – The First Carlist War (Spain) ends with the Convenio de Vergara, also known as the Abrazo de Vergara ("the embrace in Vergara"; Bergara in Basque), between liberal general Baldomero Espartero, Count of Luchana and Carlist General Rafael Maroto.

==== Portugal ====
- July 5, 1833 – Liberal Wars, Battle of Cape St. Vincent: The forces of Queen Maria II of Portugal win decisively.
- July 24, 1834 – The Liberal Wars end in Portugal.
- January 26, 1835 – Queen Maria II of Portugal marries Auguste, Duke of Leuchtenberg, in Lisbon; he dies only two months later.
- January 1, 1836 – Queen Maria II of Portugal marries Prince Ferdinand Augustus Francis Anthony of Saxe-Coburg-Gotha.

=== Africa ===
- Egba refugees fleeing the Yoruba Civil Wars found the city of Abeokuta in south-west Nigeria.
- February 14, 1831 – Battle of Debre Abbay: Ras Marye of Yejju marches into Tigray and defeats and kills the warlord Sabagadis.
- 1831 – Rifa'a at-Tahtawi returns from study in Paris to Egypt.
- December 11, 1834 – The Sixth Xhosa War is characterized by severe clashes between white settlers and Bantu peoples in Cape Colony; Dutch-speaking settlers colonize the area north of Orange River.
- February 1, 1835 – Slavery is abolished in Mauritius.
- October 10 – October 13, 1837 – The French army besieges and captures Constantine in French Algeria.
- December 16, 1838 – The Boers win a decisive victory over the Zulus in the Battle of Blood River.

==== French conquest of Algeria ====
In 1830, France invaded and quickly seized Ottoman Regency of Algiers, and rapidly took control of other coastal communities. Fighting would continue throughout the decade, with the French pitted against forces under Ahmed Bey at Constantine, primarily in the east, and nationalist forces in Kabylia and the west. The French made treaties with the nationalists under 'Abd al-Qādir, enabling them to capture Constantine in 1837. Al-Qādir continued to give stiff resistance in the west, which lasted throughout the decade (and well into the 1840s, with Al-Qādir surrendering in 1847).

=== North America ===
==== Canada ====
- May 30, 1832 – Canada: The Rideau Canal in eastern Ontario is opened.
- March 6, 1834 – York, Upper Canada, is incorporated as Toronto.
- November–December 1837 – In the Canadas, William Lyon Mackenzie leads the Upper Canada Rebellion and Louis-Joseph Papineau leads the Lower Canada Rebellion.
- May 1838 – Lord Durham and his entourage arrive in Upper Canada to investigate the cause of the 1837 rebellion in that province. This leads to Durham submitting the Durham Report to Britain.

==== United States ====
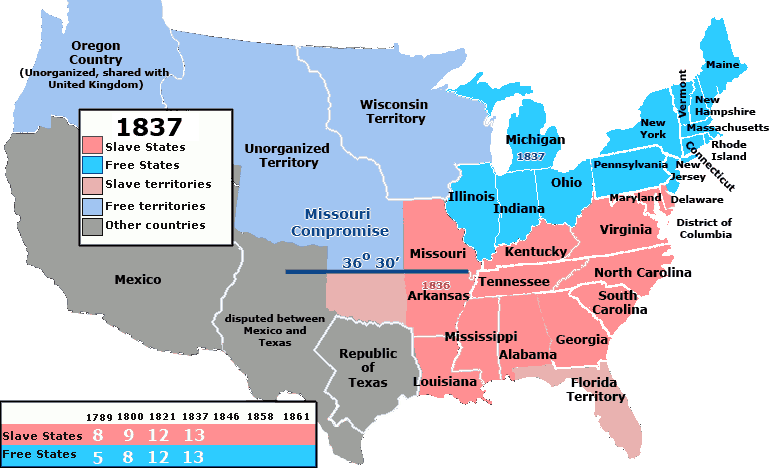
United States territories and states that forbade or allowed slavery, 1837.

===== Slavery =====
- January 1, 1831 – William Lloyd Garrison begins publishing The Liberator, an antislavery newspaper, in Boston, Massachusetts.
- August 21, 1831 – USA: Nat Turner's Rebellion breaks out in Southampton County, Virginia.
- September 19, 1835 – William Lloyd Garrison publishes Angelina Grimké's anti-slavery letter in The Liberator.
- May 13, 1837 – Pennsylvania Hall (Philadelphia) burned by mob hostile to slavery.
- November 7, 1837 – American abolitionist and newspaper editor Elijah Lovejoy is killed by a pro-slavery mob, at his warehouse in Alton, Illinois.
- July 1, 1839 – Slaves aboard the Amistad rebel and capture the ship off the coast of Cuba. Under direction to sail the ship to Africa, the crew sailed the ship to Long Island, New York, where the slaves were taken into custody by the U.S. Navy. The slaves would later win the right to return to Africa in United States v. The Amistad.

===== Settlement =====
- February 9, 1832 – The Florida Legislative Council grants a city charter for Jacksonville, Florida.
- July 10, 1832 – U.S. Survey of the Coast revived (with US Department of Treasury).
- August 12, 1833 – The city of Chicago is established at the estuary of the Chicago River by 350 settlers.
- March 11, 1834 – U.S. Survey of the Coast transferred to the Department of the Navy.
- March 27, 1836 – United States Survey of the Coast returned to U.S. Treasury Department; renamed U.S. Coast Survey.
- April 20, 1836 – The Wisconsin Territory is created.
- June 15, 1836 – Arkansas is the 25th state admitted into the United States.
- January 26, 1837 – Michigan becomes the 26th state admitted to the United States.

===== Native Americans =====
- May 28, 1830 – The United States Congress passes the Indian Removal Act.
- April 6, 1832 – The Black Hawk War begins.
- July 9, 1832 – Commissioner of Indian Affairs post created within the War Department.
- August 2, 1832 – Battle of Bad Axe ends the last major Native American rebellion east of the Mississippi in the U.S.
- 1832 – George Catlin starts to live among the Sioux in the Dakota Territory.
- 1832 – The federal government establishes a smallpox vaccination program for Native Americans (The Indian Vaccination Act of 1832).
- July 29, 1834 – Office of Indian Affairs organized in the United States.
- December 28, 1835 – The Second Seminole War breaks out in Florida.
- December 29, 1835 – The Treaty of New Echota is signed between the United States Government and members of the Cherokee Nation.
- 1835 – Fort Cass is established, the military headquarters and site of the largest internment camps during the 1838 Trail of Tears.
- May 19, 1836 – Fort Parker massacre: Among those captured by Native Americans is nine-year-old Cynthia Ann Parker; she later gives birth to a son named Quanah, who becomes the last chief of the Comanche.
- 1836 – George Catlin ends his 6-year tour of 50 tribes in the Dakota Territory.
- February 4, 1837 – Seminoles attack Fort Foster in Florida.
- May 26, 1838 – USA: The people of the Cherokee Nation are forcibly relocated during the Trail of Tears.

===== Presidents =====
- December 3, 1832 – U.S. presidential election, 1832: Andrew Jackson is re-elected president.
- March 4, 1833 – Andrew Jackson is sworn in for his second term as President of the United States.
- May 6, 1833 – In Alexandria, Virginia, the first public physical attack on an American President, with Andrew Jackson struck by a disgruntled Robert B. Randolph, who was dismissed from the navy by Jackson for embezzlement. Though the assailant was immediately apprehended, Jackson decided not to press charges.
- March 27, 1834 – Andrew Jackson is censured by the Congress of the United States (expunged in 1837).
- January 30, 1835 – An assassination is attempted against President Andrew Jackson in the United States Capitol (the first assassination attempt against a President of the United States).
- December 7, 1835 – Future U.S. President James K. Polk becomes Speaker of the House
- December 4, 1836 – Whig Party holds its first national convention, in Harrisburg, Pennsylvania.
- December 7, 1836 – 1836 United States presidential election: Martin Van Buren defeats William Henry Harrison.
- March 4, 1837 – Martin Van Buren succeeds Andrew Jackson as President of the United States.

===== Supreme Court =====
- January 12 – January 27, 1830 – Robert Y. Hayne of South Carolina debates the question of states' rights vs. federal authority with Daniel Webster of Massachusetts in the United States Congress.
- March 12, 1830 – Craig v. Missouri: The United States Supreme Court rules that state loan certificates are unconstitutional because they were bills of credit emitted by a state in violation of Article I, Section 10 of the Constitution.
- February 16, 1833 – Barron v. Baltimore: The United States Supreme Court rules that the Bill of Right only applies to the federal government, and not the state government.
- March 28, 1836 – Roger B. Taney becomes the 5th Chief Supreme Court Justice, succeeding John Marshal, and beginning the 28 year Taney Court.

===== Other =====
- November 14, 1832 – Charles Carroll, the last surviving signer of the Declaration of Independence dies at his home in Maryland at age 95.
- April 14, 1834 – The Whig Party is officially named by United States Senator Henry Clay.
- August 11 – August 12, 1834 – Ursuline Convent riots: A convent of Ursuline nuns is burned near Boston.
- January 8, 1835 – The United States public debt contracts to $0 for the only time in history.
- 1835 – Edward Strutt Abdy publishes his Journal of a Residence and Tour in the United States of North America: From April, 1833, to October 1834.
- May 10, 1837 – The Panic of 1837 begins in New York City.
- June 11, 1837 – The Broad Street Riot occurs in Boston, Massachusetts, fueled by ethnic tensions between the Irish and the Yankees.
- 1839 – the first state law permitting women to own property is passed in Jackson, Mississippi.

==== Texas War of Independence (Texas Revolution) ====
- October 2, 1835 – Province of Tejas, Northern Mexico, – Battle of Gonzales: Under orders from Mexican President-turned dictator, General Antonio López de Santa Anna, Mexican soldiers attempt to capture a cannon that the Mexican government had earlier provided to the settlers of Gonzales, Texas for protection against hostile Indians, but encounter stiff resistance from a hastily assembled militia. This became known as the "Come-and-Take-it" skirmish.
- December 9, 1835 – Texian "army" volunteers, under General Burleson, capture the town of San Antonio de Bejar from the Mexican forces occupying the town under General Martin Perfecto de Cos.
- December 20, 1835 – A Texas Declaration of Independence is first signed at Goliad, Texas.
- January 5, 1836 – David Crockett arrives in Texas.
- February 23, 1836 – The Siege of the Alamo begins, with a Texian army under the command of Lt Colonel Willam B. Travis and volunteers under Colonel James Bowie, hastily fortifying and defending the Alamo against the Mexican Army under Santa Anna.
- March 1, 1836 – Convention of 1836: Delegates from several Texian settlements gather in Washington-on-the-Brazos, Texas, to deliberate and vote on independence from Mexico.
- March 2 – Convention of 1836: The Texas Declaration of Independence is signed by 60 delegates and the Republic of Texas is declared. Sam Houston is elected as Commanding General of the Texian "Army".

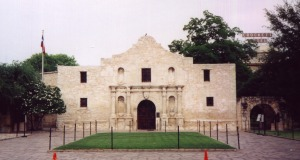
March 6, 1836: The Battle of the Alamo

- March 6, 1836 – The Battle of the Alamo ends the 13-day siege; approximately 200 defenders (Anglo settlers & Tejano townsfolk) die in a fierce struggle with approximately 5,000 Mexican soldiers.
- March 17, 1836 – Convention of 1836: Delegates adopt the Constitution of the Republic of Texas, modeled after the United States Constitution. It allows slavery, requires free blacks to petition Congress to live in the country, but prohibits import of slaves from anywhere but the United States.
- March 27, 1836 – On Palm Sunday, 342 Texian prisoners captured a week earlier are shot and killed in the Goliad Massacre along with Texian Colonel James Walker Fannin by Mexican troops in Goliad near the Presidio La Bahia during the Texas Revolution.
- April 21, 1836 – Battle of San Jacinto: Mexican forces under General Santa Anna are defeated in a battle lasting 18 minutes by the San Jacinto River, Texas. (General Houston is wounded during the battle, and is later relieved of command by interim President David G. Burnet. This action enables Houston to recover from his wounds.)
- April 22, 1836 – Forces under Texian General Sam Houston capture Mexican General Antonio López de Santa Anna who had attempted to escape during the chaos of the battle the previous day. Capturing Santa Anna guarantees Texas independence from Mexico.

==== Republic of Texas ====
- January 3, 1834 – The government of Mexico imprisons Stephen F. Austin in Mexico City.
- August 30, 1836 – The city of Houston, Texas is founded.
- September 5, 1836 – Sam Houston is elected as the first President of the Republic of Texas.
- October 22, 1836 – Sam Houston is inaugurated as first elected President of the Republic of Texas.
- June 5, 1837 – The city of Houston, is incorporated by the Republic of Texas.
- December 10, 1838 – Mirabeau B. Lamar is inaugurated as second elected President of the Republic of Texas.

==== Mexico ====
The 1830s for Mexico saw the end of the First Mexican Republic and saw General Santa Anna move in and out of the presidency in a 30-year span now known as the "Age of Santa Anna". In 1834, President Antonio López de Santa Anna dissolved Congress, forming a new government. That government instituted the Centralist Republic of Mexico by approving a new centralist constitution ("Siete Leyes"). From its formation in 1835 until its dissolution in 1846, the Centralist Republic was governed by eleven presidents (none of which finished their term). It called for the state militias to disarm, but many states resisted, including Mexican Texas, which declared independence in the Texas Revolution of 1836. During the 1840s, other provinces separated. The Republic of the Rio Grande in 1840, and the Republic of Yucatán declared independence in 1841.

- May 23, 1835 – The Mexican State of Aguascalientes is formed by decree of President Santa Anna.
- December 28, 1836 – Spain recognizes the independence of Mexico.
- May 1838 – An insurrection breaks out in Tizimín, beginning the campaign for the independence of Yucatan from Mexico.
- November 1838 – The Pastry War (also known as the First French intervention in Mexico) began with the naval blockade of some Mexican ports and the capture of the fortress of San Juan de Ulúa in Veracruz by French forces sent by King Louis-Philippe. The intervention followed many claims by French nationals of losses due to unrest in Mexico City, as well as the failure of Mexico to pay a large debt to France.
- March 1839 – The Pastry War ends with a British-brokered peace.

==== Nicaragua ====
- April 30, 1838 – Nicaragua declares independence from the Federal Republic of Central America (see Nicaragua's early history).

==== Costa Rica ====
- May 5, 1835 – Braulio Carrillo is sworn in as Head of State of Costa Rica.
- May 28, 1838 – Braulio Carrillo is sworn in as Head of State of Costa Rica, thus beginning his second term in office.

==== Puerto Rico ====
- May 7, 1836 – The settlement of Mayagüez, Puerto Rico, is elevated to the royal status of villa by the government of Spain.

==== Honduras ====
- November 5, 1838 – The Second Central American Civil War begins with Honduras' separation from the Central American Federation.

=== The Caribbean ===
==== Jamaica ====
- 27 December, 1831 – Sam Sharpe leads a major slave rebellion, also known as the Baptist War. The slave uprising lasted for 10 days and spread throughout the entire island, mobilizing as many as 60,000 of Jamaica's enslaved population. The British colonial government used the armed Jamaican military forces and warriors from the towns of the Jamaican Maroons to put down the rebellion, suppressing it within two weeks. Some 14 whites were killed by armed slave battalions, but more than 200 slaves were killed by troops.

=== South America ===
==== Brazil ====
- April 7, 1831 – Pedro I abdicates as emperor of Brazil in favor of his 5-year-old son Pedro II, who will reign for almost 59 years.
- November 7, 1831 – Slave trading is forbidden in Brazil.
- 1834 – In the Empire of Brazil, the Additional Act provides:
  - Establishment of the Provincial Legislative Assembly
  - Extinction of the State Council
  - Replacement of the Regency Trina
  - Introduction of a direct and secret ballot.
- January 24, 1835 - a major slave rebellion known as the Malê revolt takes place in Salvador, Bahia.

==== Riograndense Republic ====
- September 20, 1835 – Ragamuffin War begins in Rio Grande do Sul, Brazil.
- September 11, 1836 – Riograndense Republic is proclaimed in South America.

==== Uruguay ====
- July 18, 1830 – Uruguay adopts its first constitution.
- 1835 – Civil war erupts in Uruguay between supporters of Blanco and Colorado parties.

==== Argentina ====
- 1835 – Juan Manuel de Rosas becomes Caudillo of Argentina.

==== Falkland Islands ====
- January 3, 1833 – Britain retakes the Falkland Islands in the South Atlantic.

==== Peru ====
- January 20, 1839 – Battle of Yungay: Chile defeats the Peru–Bolivian Confederation, leading to the restoration of an independent Peru.

==== Ecuador ====
- May 13, 1830 – Ecuador separates from Gran Colombia.
- February 12, 1832 – Ecuador annexes the Galápagos Islands.

==== Chile ====
- May 25, 1833 – The Chilean Constitution of 1833 is promulgated.

== Science and technology ==
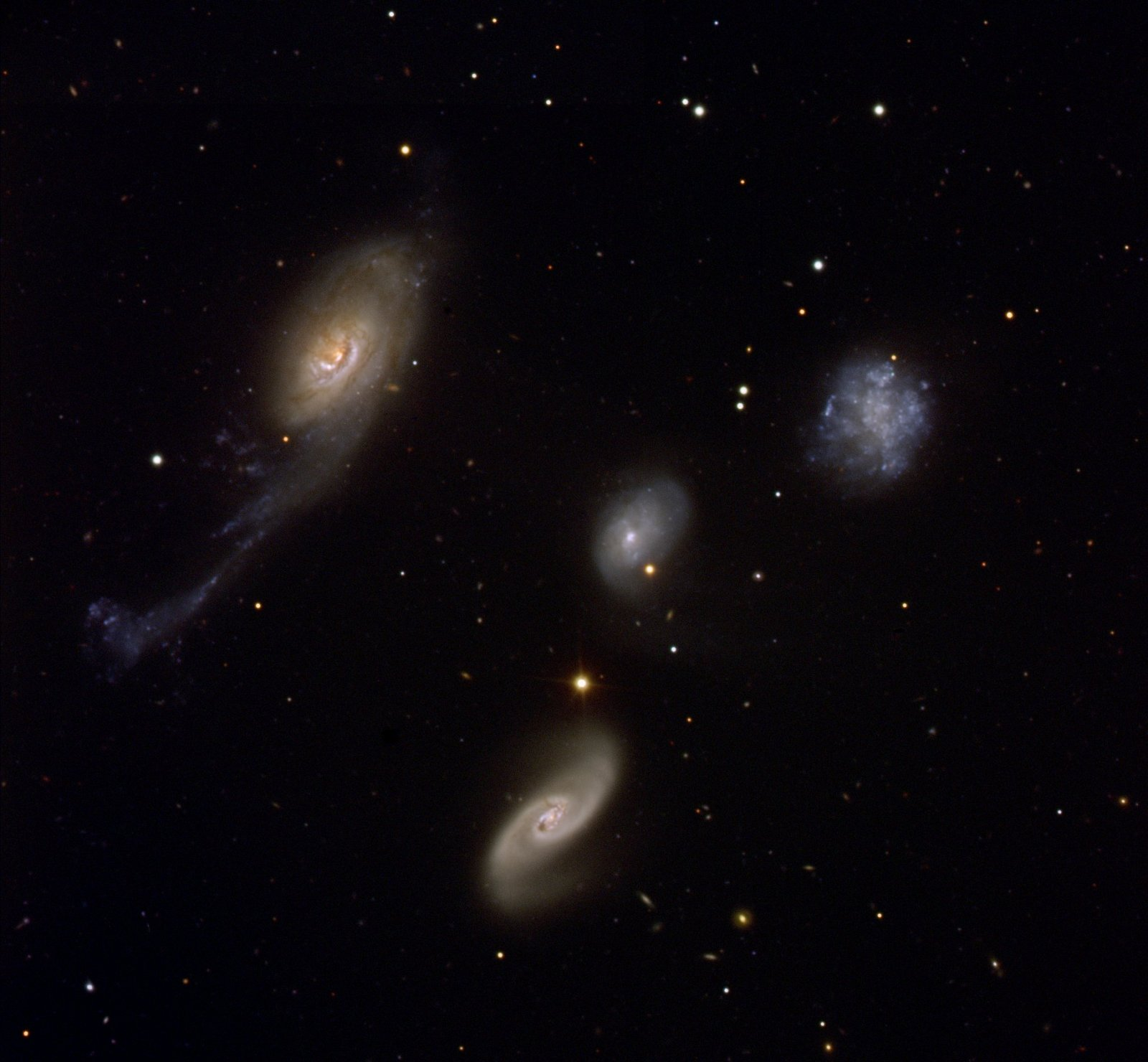
Robert's Quartet

=== Astronomy ===
- March 14, 1834 – John Herschel discovers the open cluster of stars now known as NGC 3603, observing from the Cape of Good Hope.
- September 30, 1834 – Robert's Quartet, a group of galaxies, is discovered by John Herschel.
- May 15, 1836 – Francis Baily, during an eclipse of the Sun, observes the phenomenon named after him as Baily's beads.
- 1838 – Friedrich Bessel makes the first accurate measurement of distance to a star.
- 1839 – The first parallax measurement of the distance to Alpha Centauri is published by Thomas Henderson.

=== Mechanical Engineering ===
- July 17, 1830 – Barthélemy Thimonnier is granted a patent (#7454) for a sewing machine in France; it chains stitches at 200/minute.
- August 31, 1830 – Edwin Beard Budding is granted a patent for the invention of the lawnmower.
- February 25, 1836 – Samuel Colt receives a United States patent for the Colt revolver, the first revolving barrel multishot firearm.
- February 24, 1839 – William Otis receives a patent for the steam shovel.

=== Photography ===
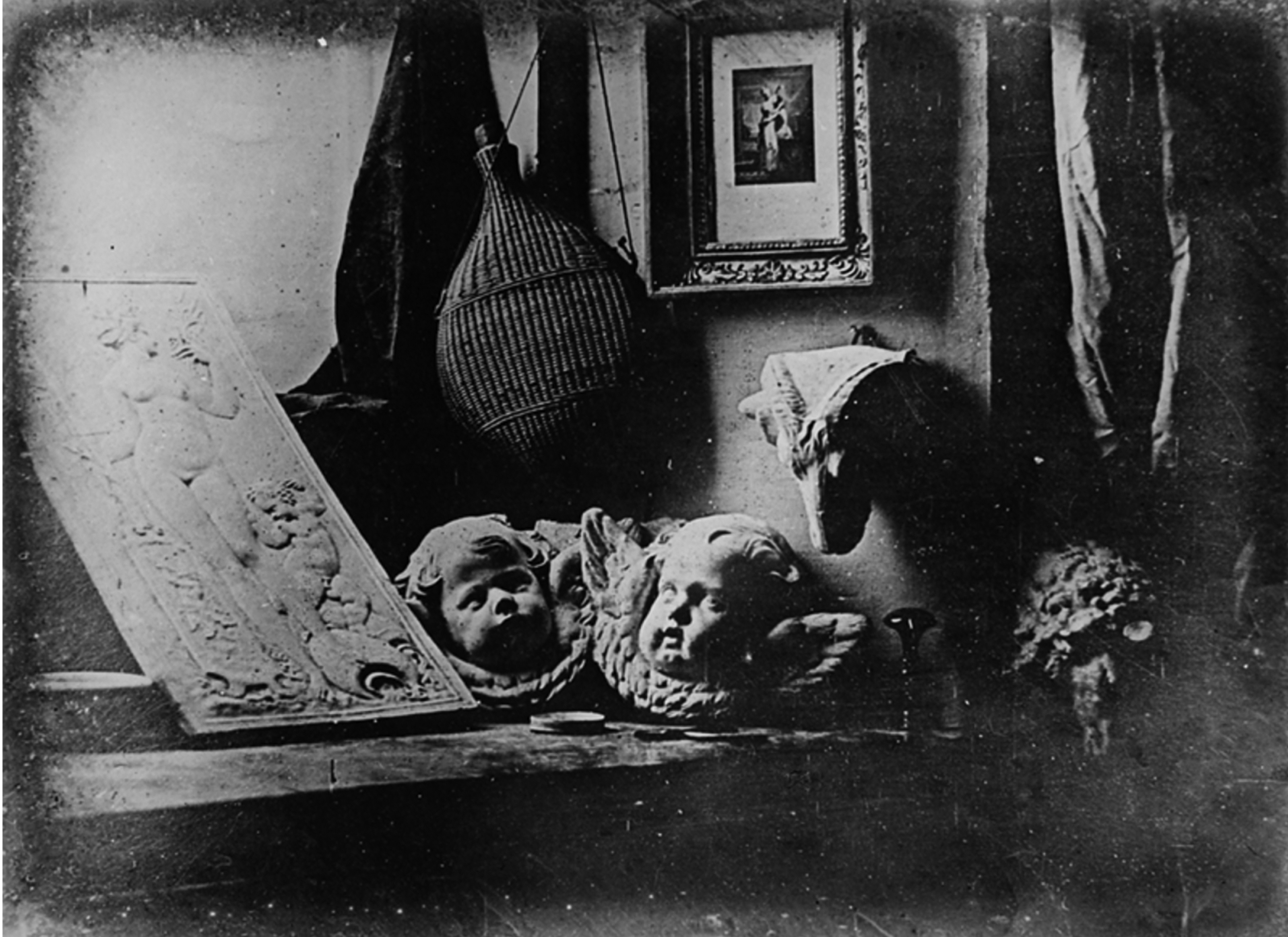
L'Atelier de l'artiste. An 1837 daguerreotype by Louis Daguerre, the first to complete the full process.

- 1833 – Joseph Plateau invented an early stroboscopic device, the "phenakistiscope", which gives the illusion of a moving image. This invention was an important precursor to cinema.
- August 1835 – Henry Fox Talbot exposes the world's first known photographic negatives at Lacock Abbey in England.
- April 1837 – Louis Daguerre develops the daguerreotype.
- January 2, 1839 – First photo of the Moon taken by photographer Louis Daguerre
- January 9, 1839 – The French Academy of Sciences announces the Daguerreotype photography process.
- June 22, 1839 – Louis Daguerre receives a patent for his camera (commercially available by September at the price of 400 francs).
- August 19, 1839 – The French government gives Louis Daguerre a pension and gives the daguerreotype "for the whole world".

=== Electricity ===
Many key discoveries about electricity were made in the 1830s. Electromagnetic induction was discovered independently by Michael Faraday and Joseph Henry in 1831; however, Faraday was the first to publish the results of his experiments. Electromagnetic induction is the production of a potential difference (voltage) across a conductor when it is exposed to a varying magnetic field. This discovery was essential to the invention of transformers, inductors, and many types of electrical motors, generators and solenoids.

In 1834, Michael Faraday's published his research regarding the quantitative relationships in electrochemical reactions, now known as Faraday's laws of electrolysis. Also in 1834, Jean C. A. Peltier discovered the Peltier "effect", which is the presence of heating or cooling at an electrified junction of two different conductors. In 1836, John Daniell invented a primary cell in which hydrogen was eliminated in the generation of the electricity.

=== Telegraph ===
- May 6, 1833 – Carl Friedrich Gauss and Wilhelm Weber obtain permission to build an electromagnetic telegraph in Göttingen.
- May 1837 – Samuel Morse patents the telegraph.
- April 9, 1839 – The world's first commercial electric telegraph line comes into operation alongside the Great Western Railway line, from Paddington Station to West Drayton.

=== Computers ===
- June 5, 1833 – Ada Lovelace is introduced to Charles Babbage by Mary Somerville.
- 1834 – Charles Babbage begins the conceptual design of an "analytical engine", a mechanical forerunner of the modern computer. It will not be built in his lifetime.

=== Chemistry ===
- 1833 – The dawn of biochemistry: The first enzyme, diastase, is discovered by Anselme Payen.
- October 24, 1836 – The earliest United States patent for a phosphorus friction match is granted to Alonzo Dwight Phillips of Springfield, Massachusetts.
- 1839 – Charles Goodyear vulcanizes rubber.

=== Biology ===
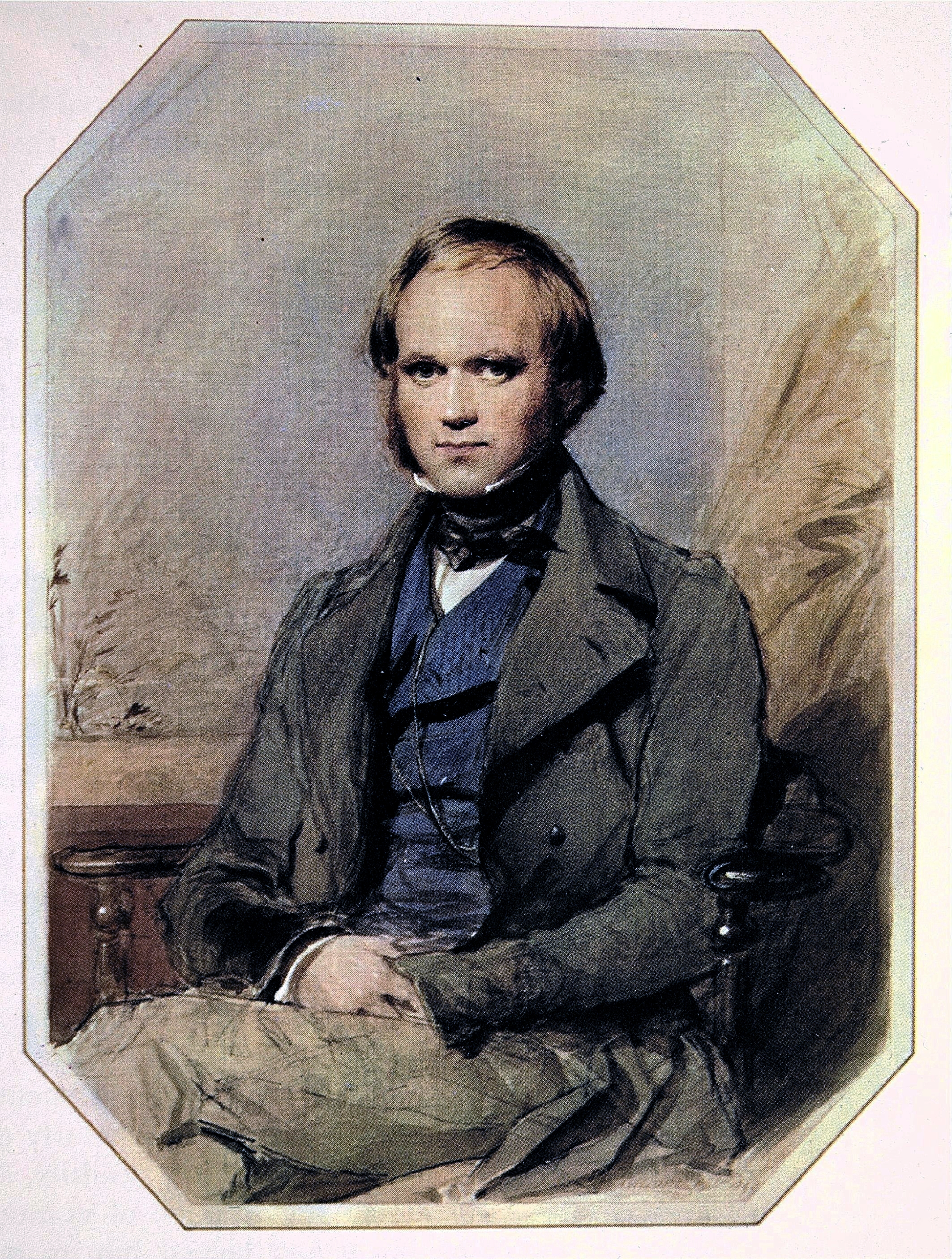
Darwin.

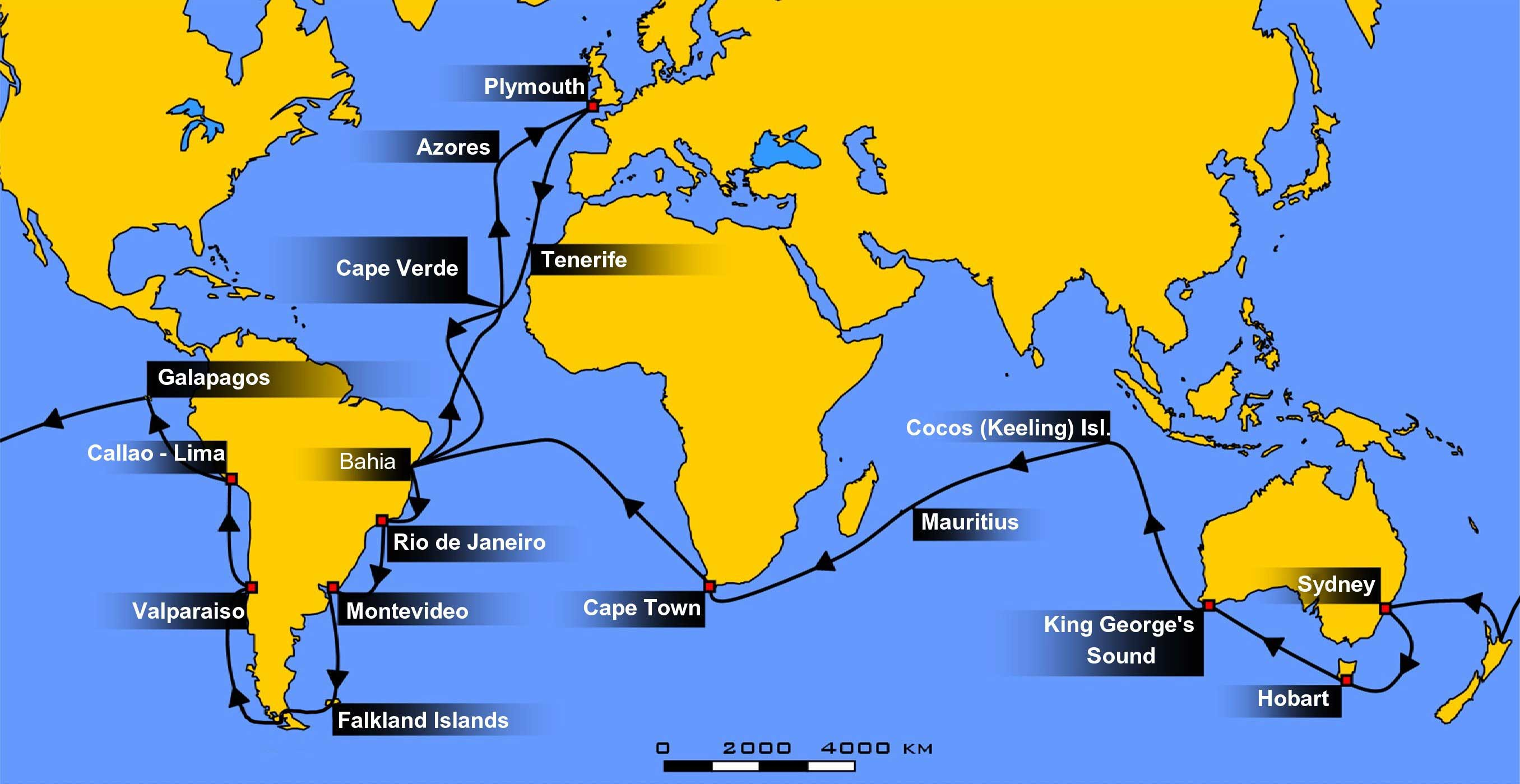
Darwin's voyage aboard HMS Beagle.

- December 27, 1831 – Charles Darwin embarks on his historic voyage aboard HMS Beagle.
- January 7, 1835 – HMS Beagle anchors off the Chonos Archipelago on the voyage of 1831–1836 with Charles Darwin.
- September 7, 1835 – Charles Darwin arrives at the Galapagos Islands aboard HMS Beagle.
- January 12, 1836 – HMS Beagle with Charles Darwin reaches Sydney.
- July 20, 1836 – Charles Darwin climbs Green Hill on Ascension Island.
- October 2, 1836 – Charles Darwin returns to England aboard HMS Beagle with biological data he will later use to develop his theory of evolution, having left South America on August 17.
- 1838 – Proteins are discovered by Jöns Jacob Berzelius.

=== Archaeology ===
- 1834 – An archaeological excavation on Copán begins.
- 1836 – Chatsworth Head found near Tamassos on Cyprus.
- 1838 – Chatsworth Head acquired by the 6th Duke of Devonshire at Smyrna from Henry Perigal Borrell.

=== Sociology ===
- July 2, 1832 – André-Michel Guerry presents his Essay on moral statistics of France, to the French Academy of Sciences, a significant step in the founding of empirical social science.

=== Transportation ===
==== Rail ====
- September 15, 1830 – The Liverpool and Manchester Railway opens, the world's first intercity passenger railway operated solely by steam locomotives.
- 1834 – The Wilmington and Raleigh Railroad is chartered in Wilmington, North Carolina.
- Railroad construction begins in earnest in the United States.
- May 5, 1835 – Rail transport in Belgium: a railway is opened between Brussels and Mechelen, the first in continental Europe.
- December 7, 1835 – The Bavarian Ludwig Railway opens between Nuremberg and Fürth, with a train hauled by Der Adler ("The Eagle"), the first railway in Germany.
- December 21, 1835 – The Raleigh and Gaston Railroad is chartered in Raleigh, North Carolina.
- February 8, 1836 – London and Greenwich Railway opens its first section, the first railway in London, England.
- July 13, 1836 – The first numbered U.S. patent 1 (after filing 9,957 unnumbered patents) is granted, to John Ruggles for improvements to railroad steam locomotive tires.
- July 21, 1836 – The Champlain and St. Lawrence Railroad opens between St. John and La Prairie, Quebec, the first steam-worked passenger railroad in British North America.
- October 25, 1836 – Construction begins on the Wilmington and Raleigh Railroad in North Carolina. Due to a lack of support in Raleigh, the route is revised to run from Wilmington to the Petersburg Railroad in Weldon.

==== Flight ====
- May 24, 1832 – Francois Arban, early French balloonist makes his 1st ascent.

==== Automobile ====
- 1834 – Thomas Davenport, the inventor of the first American DC electrical motor, installs his motor in a small model car, creating one of the first electric cars.

==== Steamships ====
- August 18, 1833 – The Canadian ship SS Royal William sets out from Pictou, Nova Scotia, on a 25-day passage of the Atlantic Ocean largely under steam to Gravesend, Kent, England.
- April 4 – April 22, 1838 – The paddle steamer SS Sirius (1837) makes the Transatlantic Crossing to New York from Cork, Ireland, in eighteen days, though not using steam continuously.
- April 8 – April 23, 1838 – Isambard Kingdom Brunel's paddle steamer SS Great Western (1838) makes the Transatlantic Crossing to New York from Avonmouth, England, in fifteen days, inaugurating a regular steamship service.

== Economics ==
=== Inventions ===
- 1830: Lawn mower
- Sewing machine
- Airlock

=== Economic trends ===
- A period of economic prosperity in America and Europe, mainly due to increasing trade, the mass production of railroads, and the Erie Canal.
- Dutch-speaking farmers known as Voortrekkers emigrate northwards from the Cape Colony.
- The destruction of the second bank of the United States occurred in 1836 as a result of the Bank War

== Popular culture ==
=== Literature ===
- Charles Dickens publishes his first novel The Pickwick Papers followed by Oliver Twist and Nicholas Nickleby
- January 14, 1831 – The Hunchback of Notre-Dame is first published by Victor Hugo.
- 1832 – Publication of the first Baedeker guidebook, Voyage du Rhin de Mayence à Cologne, in Koblenz.
- 1832 – Publication begins (posthumously) of Carl von Clausewitz's Vom Kriege ("On War").
- June 10, 1834 – Thomas Carlyle moves to Cheyne Row (Carlyle's House) in London.
- August 25, 1835 – In the U.S., the New York Sun prints the first of six installments of the Great Moon Hoax.
- December 1, 1835 – Hans Christian Andersen publishes his first book of fairy tales.
- March 1836 – First monthly part of Charles Dickens' The Pickwick Papers ("The Posthumous Papers of the Pickwick Club ..., edited by Boz") published in London.
- 1836 – The first printed literature in Assyrian Neo-Aramaic is produced by Justin Perkins, an American Presbyterian missionary.
- February 1837 – Charles Dickens's Oliver Twist begins publication in serial form in London.
- March 23, 1839 – The Boston Morning Post first records the use of "OK" (oll korrect).

=== Theatre ===
- March 1, 1836 – Antonio García Gutiérrez's play El Trovador is performed for the first time in Madrid, Spain.

=== Music ===
- December 5, 1830 – Hector Berlioz's most famous work, Symphonie fantastique, has its world premiere in Paris.
- February 26, 1832 — Frederic Chopin gives his first major Paris concert, solidifying his reputation among the city's artistic elite and rubbing shoulders with contemporaries like Franz Liszt and Felix Mendelssohn.
- 1833 – Richard Wagner completes his first opera, Die Feen (The Fairies).
- November 17, 1839 – Giuseppe Verdi's first opera, Oberto, conte di San Bonifacio, opens in Milan.

=== Sports ===
- Croquet invented in Ireland.

=== Fashion ===
- Innovations in roller printing on textiles introduced new dress fabrics.
- Broad, exaggerated sleeves for women and padded shoulders for men contrasted a narrow, idealized waist.
- Brocades come back into style.
- Low boots with elastic insets appear.
- Greatcoats, overcoats with wide sleeves, become fashionable for men to wear with day wear.

== Religion ==
- March 26, 1830 – The Book of Mormon is published in Palmyra, New York.
- April 6, 1830 – Joseph Smith and 5 others organize the Church of Christ (later renamed the Church of Jesus Christ of Latter Day Saints), the first formally organized church of the Latter Day Saint movement, in northwestern New York.
- February 2, 1831 – Pope Gregory XVI succeeds Pope Pius VIII as the 254th pope.
- August 7, 1831 – American Baptist minister William Miller preaches his first sermon on the Second Advent of Christ in Dresden, New York, launching the Advent Movement in the United States.
- March 24, 1832 – In Hiram, Ohio, a group of men beat, tar and feather Latter Day Saint movement founder Joseph Smith.
- October 27, 1838 – Missouri Governor Lilburn Boggs declares Mormons to be enemies of the state and encourages the extermination or the exile of the religious minority, forcing nearly 10,000 Mormons out of the state.
- 1838 – Biblical criticism: Christian Hermann Weisse proposes the two-source hypothesis.

== Disasters, natural events, and notable mishaps ==
- June 29, 1833 – William Fraser Tolmie experiences an earthquake at Fort Nisqually. His journal entry records the first written eyewitness account of an earthquake in the Puget Sound region.
- November 12 – November 13, 1833 – Stars Fell on Alabama: A spectacular occurrence of the Leonid meteor shower is observed in Alabama.
- November 25, 1833 – A major 8.7 earthquake strikes Sumatra.
- October 16, 1834 – The Palace of Westminster is destroyed by fire.
- February 20, 1835 – Concepción, Chile, is destroyed by an earthquake.
- November 16, 1835 – Halley's Comet reaches perihelion, its closest approach to the sun.
- December 16 – December 17, 1835 – The Great Fire of New York destroys 530 buildings, including the New York Stock Exchange.
- December 15, 1836 – The United States Patent Office burns in Washington, D.C.
- December 27, 1836 – Lewes avalanche: An avalanche at Lewes in Sussex, England, kills eight of fifteen people buried when a row of cottages is engulfed in snow.
- December 30, 1836 – In Saint Petersburg, the Lehman Theater catches fire, killing 800 people.
- January 1, 1837 – Galilee earthquake.
- August 1837 to August 1838 – Agra famine of 1837–1838, India
- December 17, 1837 – Fire in the Winter Palace, Saint Petersburg.
- January 10, 1838 – A fire destroys Lloyd's Coffee House and the Royal Exchange in London.
- September 7, 1838 – Grace Darling and her father rescue thirteen survivors from the SS Forfarshire off the Farne Islands.
- September 9, 1839 – In the Great Fire of Mobile, Alabama, hundreds of buildings are burned.
- November 25, 1839 – A disastrous cyclone slams India with terrible winds and a giant 40-foot storm surge, wiping out the port city of Coringa; 300,000 people die.

=== Cholera ===
Historians believe that the first cholera pandemic had lingered in Indonesia and the Philippines in 1830. The second cholera pandemic spread from India to Russia and then to the rest of Europe claiming hundreds of thousands of lives. It reached Moscow in August 1830, and by 1831, the epidemic had infiltrated Russia's main cities and towns.

Russian soldiers brought the disease to Poland during the November Uprising. "Cholera riots" occurred in Russia, caused by the anti-cholera measures undertaken by the tsarist government.

The epidemic reached western Europe later in 1831. In London, the disease claimed 6,536 victims; in Paris, 20,000 died (out of a population of 650,000), with about 100,000 deaths in all of France. In 1832 the epidemic reached Quebec, Ontario, and Nova Scotia, Canada; and Detroit and New York City in the United States. It reached the Pacific coast of North America between 1832 and 1834.

== Establishments ==
- January 11, 1830 – LaGrange College (now the University of North Alabama) opens its doors, becoming the first publicly chartered college in Alabama.
- July 13, 1830 – The General Assembly's Institution, now the Scottish Church College, one of the pioneering institutions that ushered the Bengal Renaissance, is founded by Alexander Duff and Raja Ram Mohan Roy, in Calcutta, India.
- 1830 – Austins of Derry established in Northern Ireland and, until 2016, remained standing as the world's oldest independent department store.
- March 10, 1831 – The French Foreign Legion is founded.
- December 31, 1831 – Gramercy Park is deeded to New York City.
- April 18, 1831 – University of Alabama founded.
- 1831 – Founding of Denison University in Granville, Ohio
- 1831 – Founding of Wesleyan University in Middletown, Connecticut
- 1831 – Founding of New York University in New York City
- 1831 – Founding of Xavier University in Cincinnati, Ohio (as "The Athenaeum")
- 1831 – The Sydney Morning Herald newspaper is first published.
- July 4, 1832 – The University of Durham is founded by an act of Parliament and given royal assent by King William IV.
- 1832 – Belvedere College, Dublin, is founded by the order of the Jesuit Society of Ireland.
- October 19, 1832 – Alpha Delta Phi fraternity is founded at Hamilton College.
- November 21, 1832 – Wabash College, a small, private, liberal arts college for men, is founded.
- August 1, 1833 – King William's College on the Isle of Man officially opens.
- 1833 – Foundation of Kalamazoo College in Kalamazoo, Michigan
- 1833 – Foundation of Madras College, St Andrews
- 1833 – Foundation of Oberlin College in Oberlin, Ohio
- November 4, 1834 – Delta Upsilon fraternity is founded at Williams College.
- 1834 – Medical School of Louisiana is founded, later to become Tulane University in New Orleans.
- March 23, 1835 – The Mexican Academy of Language is established.
- June 1, 1835 – Kingston Penitentiary in Kingston, Ontario, opens.
- July 14, 1835 – Organisation of the universal Catholic Apostolic Church, initially in the U.K.
- August 28, 1835 – Castleknock College is founded by the Vincentian order in Dublin, Ireland.
- October 3, 1835 – Staedtler Company founded by J.S. Staedtler in Nuremberg, Germany.
- 1835 – The British Geological Survey is founded as the world's first national geological survey.
- 1835 – The Cachar Levy, forerunner of the Assam Rifles, is founded in India.
- 1835 – The first Bulgarian-language school opens in the Ottoman Empire.
- 1835 – Charles-Louis Havas creates Havas, the first news agency in the world (which later spawns Agence France-Presse).
- 1836 – The New Board brokerage group is founded in New York City.
- February 25, 1837 – In Philadelphia, The Institute for Colored Youth (ICY) is founded as the first institution for the higher education of black people in the United States.
- March 4, 1837 – The city of Chicago is incorporated.
- 1837 – At Le Mans, France, Father Basil Moreau, CSC, founds the Congregation of Holy Cross by joining the Brothers of St. Joseph and the Auxiliary Priests of Le Mans.
- November 8, 1837 – Mount Holyoke Female Seminary, later Mount Holyoke College, is founded in South Hadley, Massachusetts.
- 1838 – Duke University is established in North Carolina.
- November 3, 1838 – The Bombay Times and Journal of Commerce is founded (renamed The Times of India in 1861).
- February 11, 1839 – The University of Missouri is established, becoming the first public university west of the Mississippi River.
- March 5, 1839 – Longwood University is founded in Farmville, Virginia.
- March 7, 1839 – Baltimore City College, the third public high school in the United States, is established in Baltimore, Maryland.
- March 26, 1839 – The first Henley Royal Regatta is held.
- August 8, 1839 – The Beta Theta Pi fraternity is founded in Oxford, Ohio.
- November 11, 1839 – The Virginia Military Institute is founded in Lexington, Virginia.
- November 27, 1839 – In Boston, Massachusetts, the American Statistical Association is founded.
- 1839 – Episcopal High School in Alexandria, Virginia, is founded.
- 1839 – The Anti-Corn Law League is founded in Manchester.

== Births ==
1830

=== January–June ===
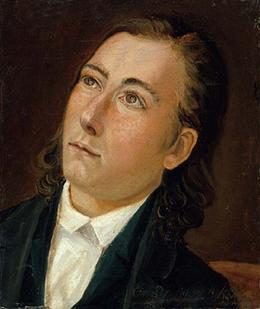
Lars Hertervig

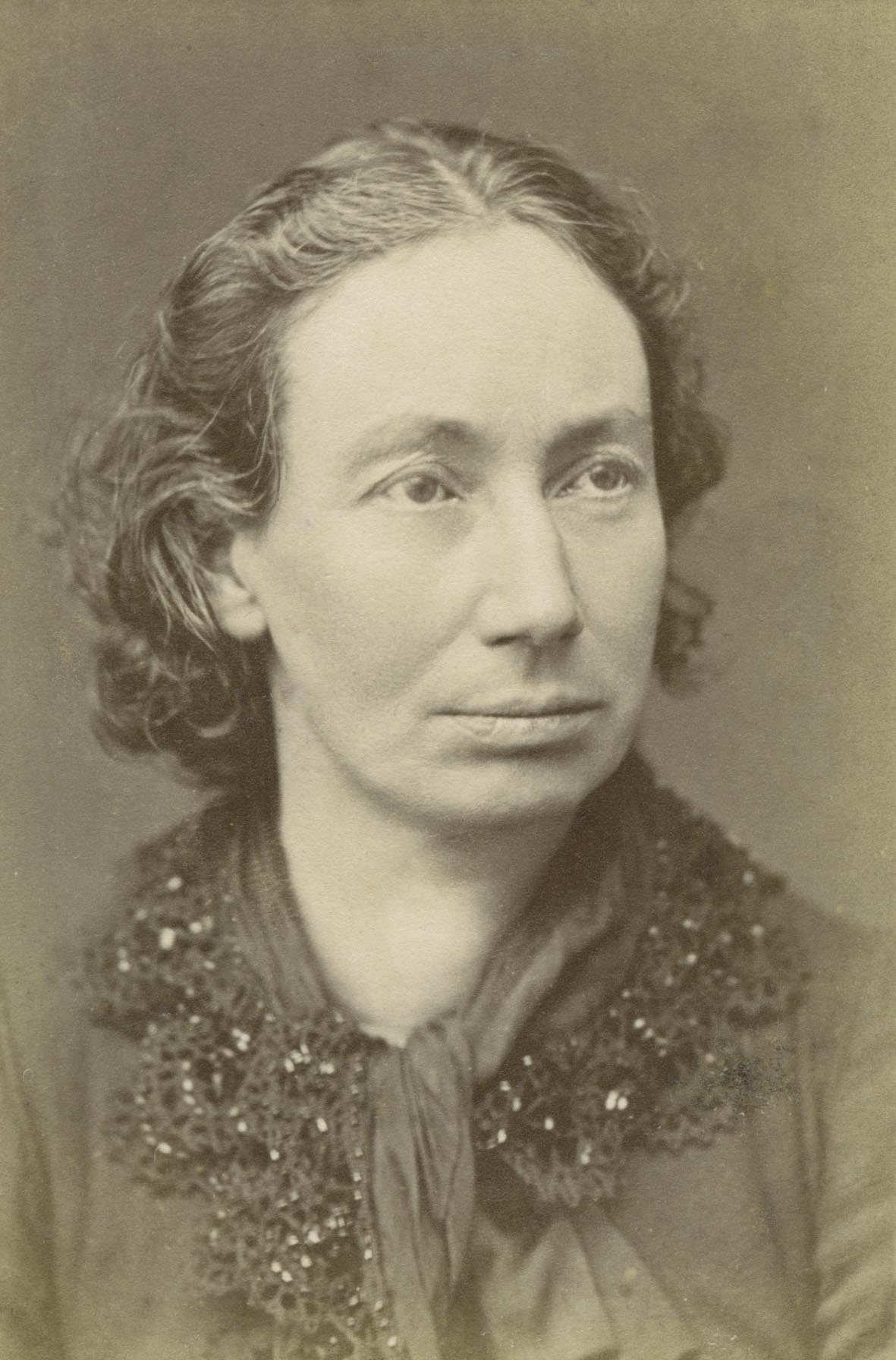
Louise Michel

- January 7 – Albert Bierstadt, German-American painter (d. 1902)
- January 8 – Hans von Bülow, German conductor, pianist and composer (d. 1894)
- January 21 – Liu Kunyi, Chinese general (d. 1902)
- January 23 – Gaston, Marquis de Galliffet, French general (d. 1909)
- January 31 – James G. Blaine, 28th and 31st United States Secretary of State (d. 1893)
- February 3 – Robert Gascoyne-Cecil, 3rd Marquess of Salisbury, Prime Minister of the United Kingdom (d. 1903)
- February 8 – Abdülaziz, Ottoman Sultan (d. 1876)
- February 16 – Lars Hertervig, Norwegian painter (d. 1902)
- March 15 – Paul Heyse, German writer, Nobel Prize laureate (d. 1914)
- March 21 – Friedrich von Beck-Rzikowsky, Austrian general (d. 1920)
- March 26 – Dewitt Clinton Senter, American politician, 18th Governor of Tennessee (d. 1898)
- May 5 – John Batterson Stetson, American hat maker (d. 1906)
- May 9 – Harriet Lane, Acting First Lady of the United States (d. 1903)
- May 10 – François-Marie Raoult, French chemist (d. 1901)
- May 14 – Antonio Annetto Caruana, Maltese archaeologist, author (d. 1905)
- May 29 – Louise Michel, French anarchist (d. 1905)
- April 9 – Eadweard Muybridge, English photographer, pioneer of photographic studies of motion (d. 1904)
- April 21 – Clémence Royer, French anthropologist (d. 1902)
- June 1 – Martha Hooper Blackler Kalopothakes, American missionary, journalist, translator (d. 1871)
- June 5 – Carmine Crocco, Italian brigand (d. 1905)
- June 22 – Theodor Leschetizky, Polish pianist, professor and composer (d. 1915)

=== July–December ===
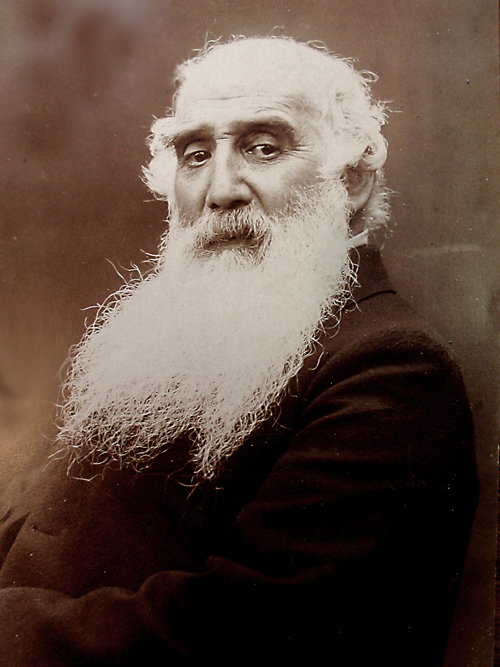
Camille Pissarro

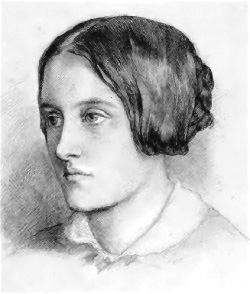
Christina Rossetti

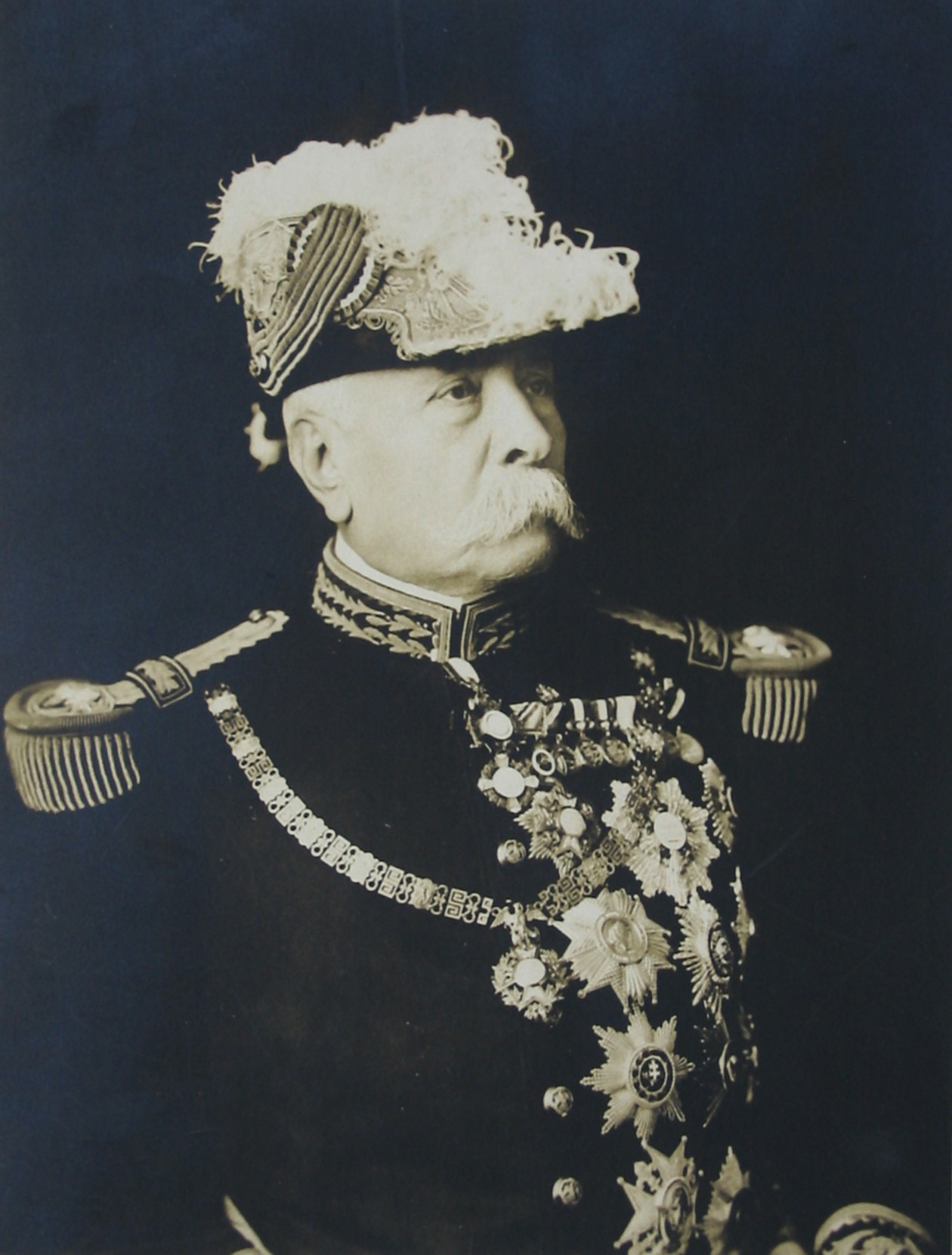
Porfirio Diaz

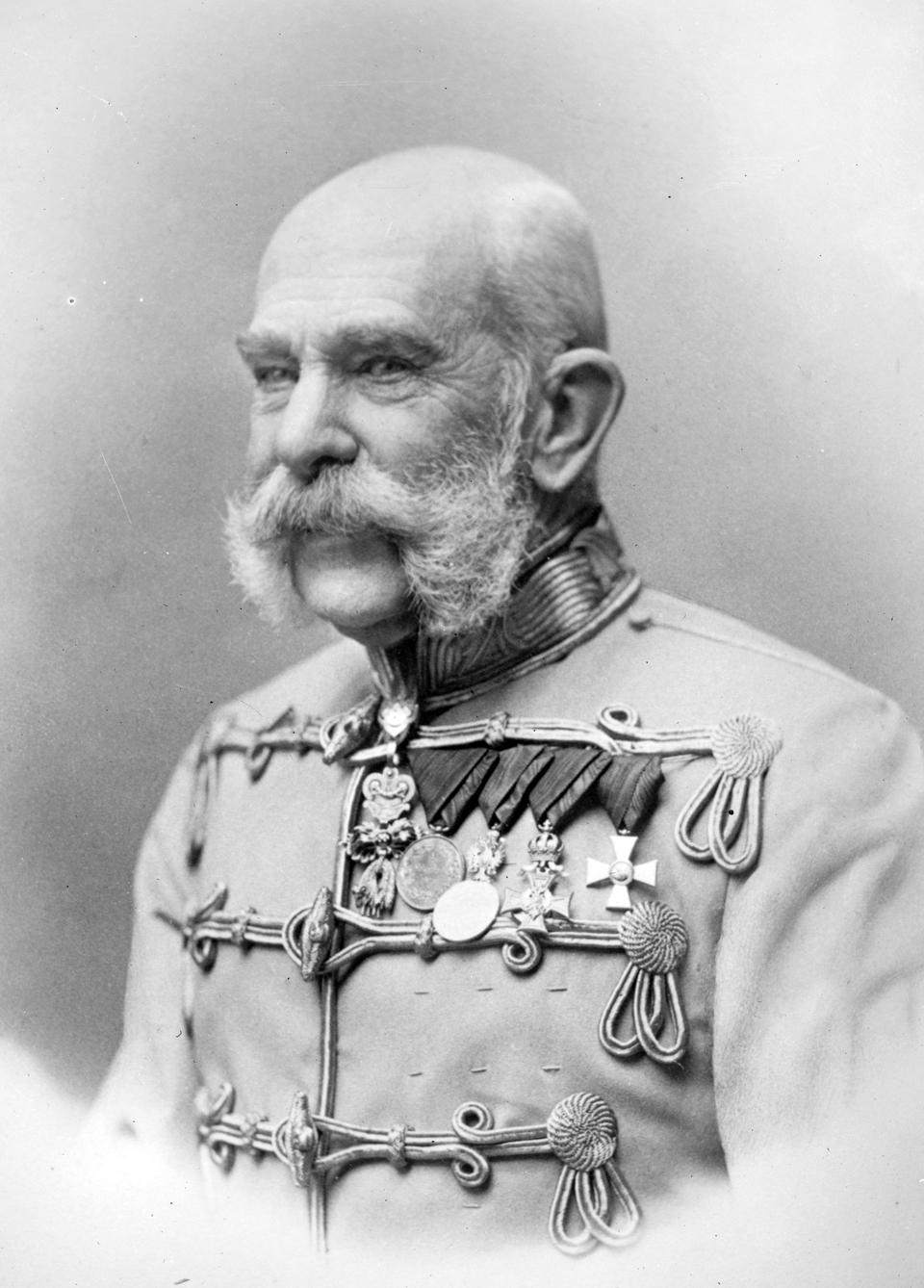
Franz Joseph I of Austria

- July 8 – Frederick W. Seward, American politician (d. 1915)
- July 10 – Camille Pissarro, French painter (d. 1903)
- July 20 – Clements Markham, English explorer (d. 1916)
- July 21 – John H. Lewis, American politician (d. 1929)
- July 22 – William Sooy Smith, American civil engineer and general (d. 1916)
- July 25 – John Jacob Bausch, German-American optician who co-founded Bausch & Lomb (d. 1926)
- August 18 – Emperor Franz Joseph I of Austria (d. 1916)
- August 26 – Daniel Webster Jones, American Latter-day Saint pioneer (d. 1915)
- September 2 – William P. Frye, American politician (d. 1911)
- September 8 – Frédéric Mistral, French writer, Nobel Prize laureate (d. 1914)
- September 12 – William Sprague IV, American politician from Rhode Island (d. 1915)
- September 15 – Porfirio Díaz, 29th President of Mexico (d. 1915)
- September 17 – Maria Theresia Bonzel, German Roman Catholic nun and saint (d. 1905)
- September 20 – Sir Edward Reed, British naval architect, author, politician, and railroad magnate (d. 1906)
- September 22 – Caroline Webster Schermerhorn Astor, prominent American socialite (d. 1908)
- October 10 – Queen Isabella II of Spain (d. 1904)
- November 7 – Emanuele Luigi Galizia, Maltese architect, civil engineer (d. 1907)
- November 8 – Oliver Otis Howard, American Civil War general (d. 1909)
- December 5 – Christina Rossetti, English poet (d. 1894)
- December 10 – Emily Dickinson, American poet (d. 1886)
- December 16 – Kálmán Tisza, 9th Prime Minister of Hungary (d. 1902)
- December 17 – Jules de Goncourt, French writer (d. 1870)
- December 19 – Susan Huntington Gilbert Dickinson, American writer and publisher (d. 1913)
- December 21 – Bartolomé Masó, Cuban patriot (d. 1907)

=== Date unknown ===
- Robert Abbott, Australian politician (d. 1901)
- Mary Hunt, American activist (d. 1906)
- Charles D. F. Phillips, British medical doctor (d. 1904)
- Su Sanniang, Chinese rebel (d. 1854)

1831

=== January–June ===
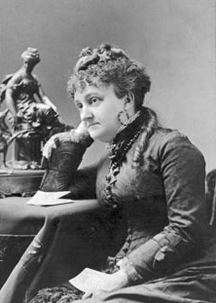
Myra Bradwell

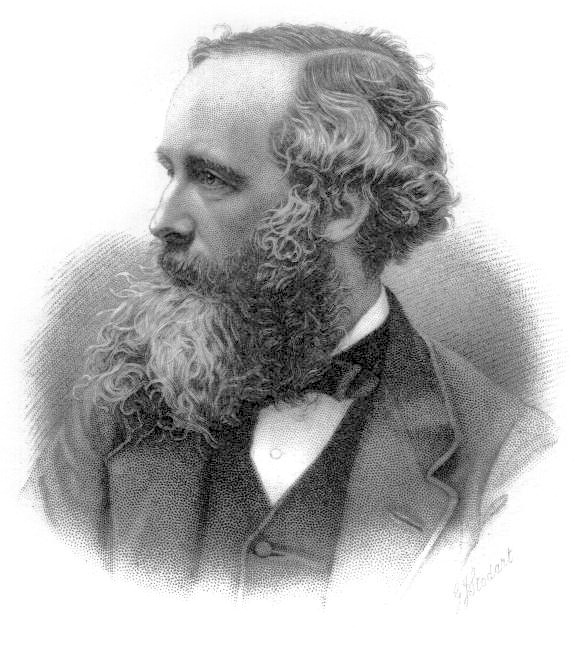
James Clerk Maxwell

- January 3 – Savitribai Jyotirao Phule, Indian social reformer, poet (d. 1897)
- January 7 – Heinrich von Stephan, German postal union organizer (d. 1897)
- January 11 – Pope Cyril V of Alexandria (d. 1927)
- January 26 – Heinrich Anton de Bary, German botanist, mycologist (d. 1888)
- February 12 – Myra Bradwell, American lawyer, political activist (d. 1894)
- February 24 – Leo von Caprivi, Chancellor of Germany (d. 1899)
- March 3
  - Gioacchino La Lomia, Italian Roman Catholic priest and venerable (d. 1905)
  - George Pullman, American inventor and industrialist (d. 1897)
- March 6
  - Philip Sheridan, American general (d. 1888)
  - Marguerite Tinayre, French educator, writer, socialist and political activist (d. 1895)
- March 12 – Clement Studebaker, American automobile pioneer (d. 1901)
- March 15 – Mariano Álvarez, Filipino general (d. 1924)
- March 16 – Elise Hwasser, Swedish actress (d. 1894)
- April 3 – Adelaide of Löwenstein-Wertheim-Rosenberg, Queen consort of Portugal (d. 1909)
- April 6 – Nire Kagenori, Japanese admiral (d. 1900)
- April 19 – Mary Louise Booth, American writer, editor and translator (d. 1889)
- May 7 – Richard Norman Shaw, British architect (d. 1912)
- June 1 – John Bell Hood, American Confederate general (d. 1879)
- June 2 – Jan Gerard Palm, Curaçao-born composer (d. 1906)
- June 7 – Amelia Edwards, English journalist and author (d. 1892)
- June 13 – James Clerk Maxwell, Scottish physicist (d. 1879)
- June 28 – Joseph Joachim, Austrian violinist (d. 1907)

=== July–December ===
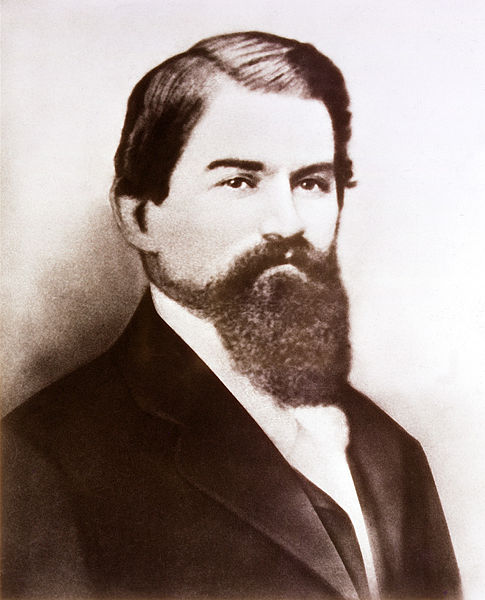
John Stith Pemberton

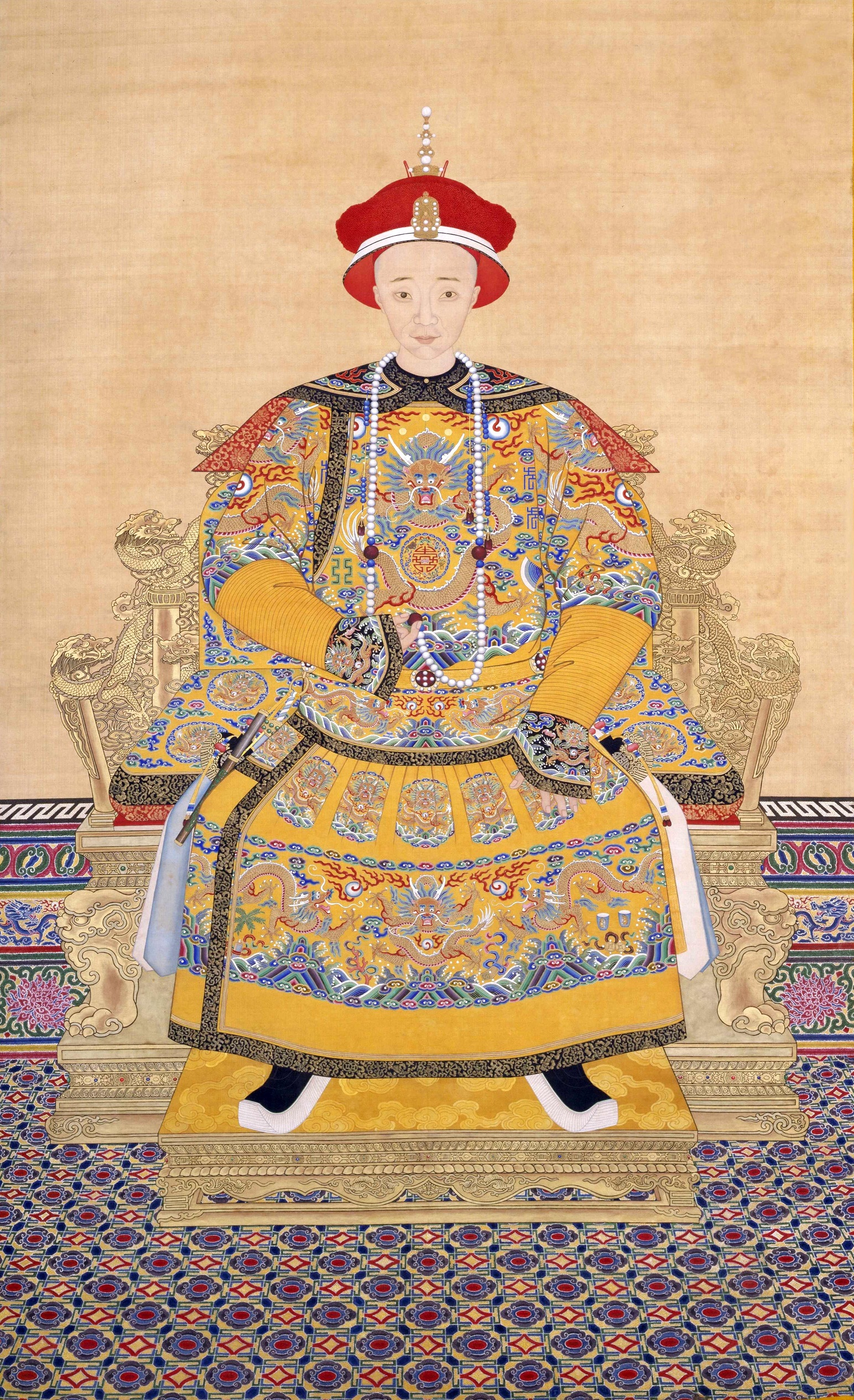
Xianfeng Emperor

Emperor Kōmei

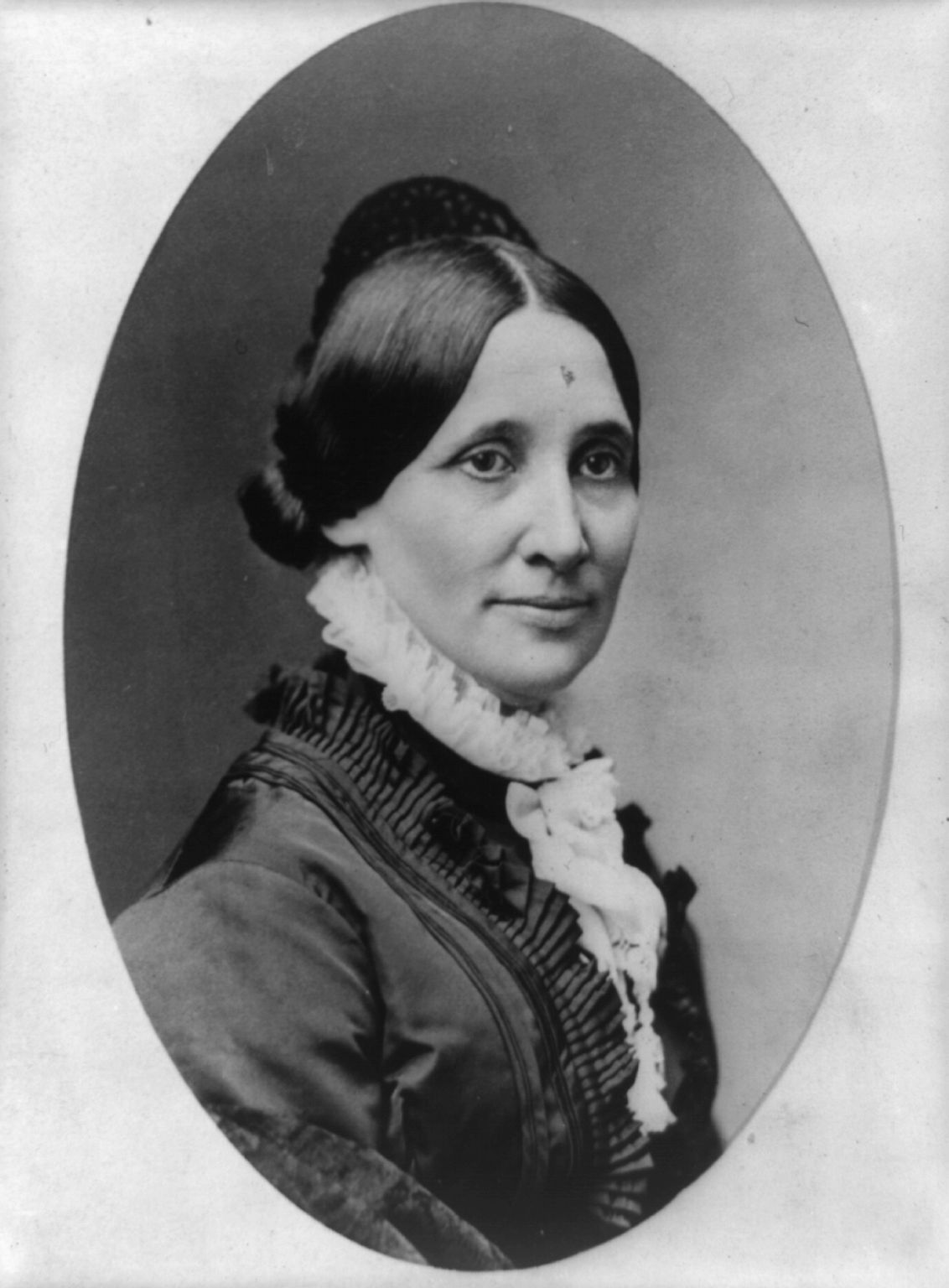
Lucy Hayes

- July 8 – John Stith Pemberton, American inventor of Coca-Cola (d. 1888)
- July 9 – Wilhelm His Sr., Swiss anatomist (d. 1904)
- July 17 – Xianfeng Emperor of China (d. 1861)
- July 22 – Emperor Kōmei of Japan (d. 1867)
- August 12 – Helena Blavatsky, Russian-born author, theosophist (d. 1891)
- August 16 – Ebenezer Cobb Morley, English sportsman and the father of modern football (d. 1924)
- August 20 – Eduard Suess, Austrian geologist (d. 1914)
- August 28 – Lucy Webb Hayes, First Lady of the United States (d. 1889)
- September 3 – States Rights Gist, Confederate Brigadier General in the American Civil War (d. 1864)
- September 8 – Wilhelm Raabe, German novelist (d. 1910)
- September 18 – Siegfried Marcus, German-born automobile pioneer (d. 1898)
- September 20 – Kate Harrington, American teacher, writer and poet (d. 1917)
- September 29 – John Schofield, American general (d. 1906)
- October 6 – Richard Dedekind, German mathematician (d. 1916)
- October 14 – Samuel W. Johnson, English railway mechanical engineer (d. 1912)
- October 16 – Lucy Stanton, American abolitionist (d. 1910)
- October 18 – Frederick III, German Emperor (d. 1888)
- October 18 - Robert Potter, author and minister (d. 1908)
- October 29 – Othniel Charles Marsh, American paleontologist (d. 1899)
- October 31
  - Paolo Mantegazza, Italian neurologist, physiologist, anthropologist and fiction writer (d. 1910)
  - Romualdo Pacheco, Governor of California (d. 1899)
- November 1 – Harry Atkinson, 10th Premier of New Zealand (d. 1892)
- November 5 – Anna Leonowens, Anglo-Indian educator (Anna of The King and I) (d. 1915)
- November 7 – Mélanie Calvat, French Roman Catholic nun, Marian Visionary, canonized (d. 1904)
- November 19 – James A. Garfield, 20th President of the United States (d. 1881)
- December 1 – Princess Maria Amélia of Brazil, daughter of Emperor Pedro I of Brazil (d. 1853)
- December 14 – Arsenio Martínez Campos, Spanish general, revolutionary and prime minister (d. 1900)
- December 19 – Bernice Pauahi Bishop, Hawaiian aliʻi (d. 1884)

=== Date unknown ===
- Richard Hawksworth Barnes, English coffee grower, naturalist and meteorologist (d. 1904)
- Jacob W. Davis, (b. Jacob Youphes), Latvian-born American tailor, inventor of jeans (d. 1908)
- Sotirios Sotiropoulos, Greek economist, politician (d. 1898)
- Eugenia Kisimova, Bulgarian feminist, philanthropist, women's rights activist (d. 1885)

1832

=== January–February ===
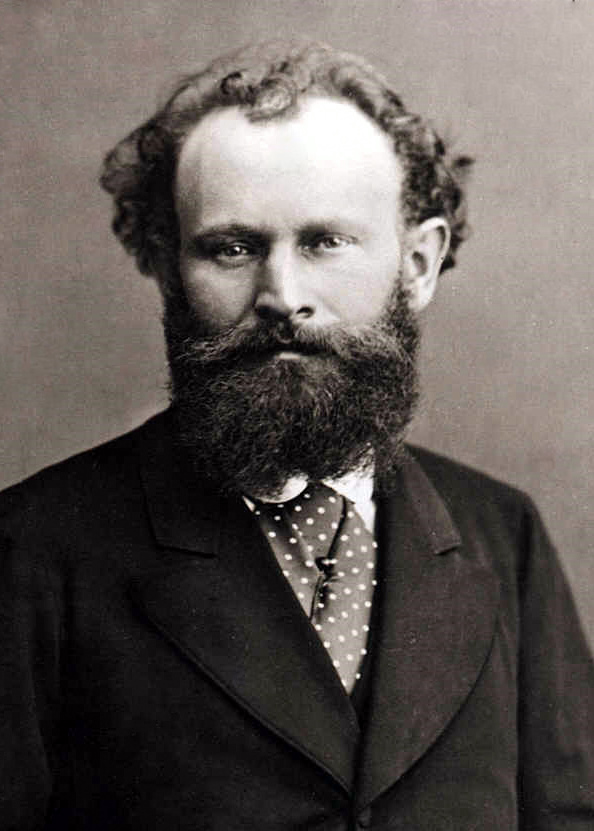
Édouard Manet

T. Muthuswamy Iyer

- January 1
  - Tom Jeffords, US Army scout and Indian agent (d. 1914)
  - Charles N. Felton, American banker and politician (d. 1914)
- January 4
  - Sir George Tryon, British admiral (d. 1893)
  - Antoine Chanzy, French general and governor of Algeria (d. 1883)
- January 6 – Gustave Doré, French painter, sculptor (d. 1883)
- January 13 – Horatio Alger, Jr., American Unitarian minister, author (d. 1899)
- January 21 – Carl Hubert von Wendt, German landowner and politician (d. 1903)
- January 22 – Alonzo B. Cornell, 27th Governor of New York (d. 1904)
- January 23
  - Édouard Manet, French painter (d. 1883)
  - Charlotte Pousette, Swedish stage actress (d. 1877)
- January 24
  - Joseph Hodges Choate, American lawyer and diplomat (d. 1917)
  - Albert Arnz, German landscape painter (d. 1914)
- January 25
  - Ivan Shishkin, Russian landscape painter (d. 1898)
  - Paul Bronsart von Schellendorff, Prussian general and writer (d. 1891)
- January 26 – George Shiras Jr., Associate Justice of the Supreme Court of the United States (d. 1924)
- January 27 – Lewis Carroll, English author (d. 1898)
- January 28 – Sir Charles Gough, British general, Victoria Cross recipient (d. 1912)
- January 28
  - T. Muthuswamy Iyer, Lawyer, first Indian Judge of the Madras high court (d. 1895)
  - Franz Wüllner, German composer and conductor (d. 1902)
- January 29 – Wilhelm Böckmann, German architect (d. 1902)
- January 30 – Infanta Luisa Fernanda of Spain, Duchess of Montpensier (d. 1897)
- February 6 – John B. Gordon, attorney, slaveholding planter, general in the Confederate States Army, and politician (d. 1904)
- February 9 – Adele Spitzeder, German actress, folk singer and confidence trickster (d. 1895)
- February 18 – Octave Chanute, French-American engineer, aviation pioneer (d. 1910)
- February 21 – Louis Maurer, German-American lithographer, and the father of painter Alfred Henry Maurer (d. 1932)
- February 26 – John George Nicolay, German-American author, diplomat, and private secretary to Abraham Lincoln (d. 1901)

=== March–April ===
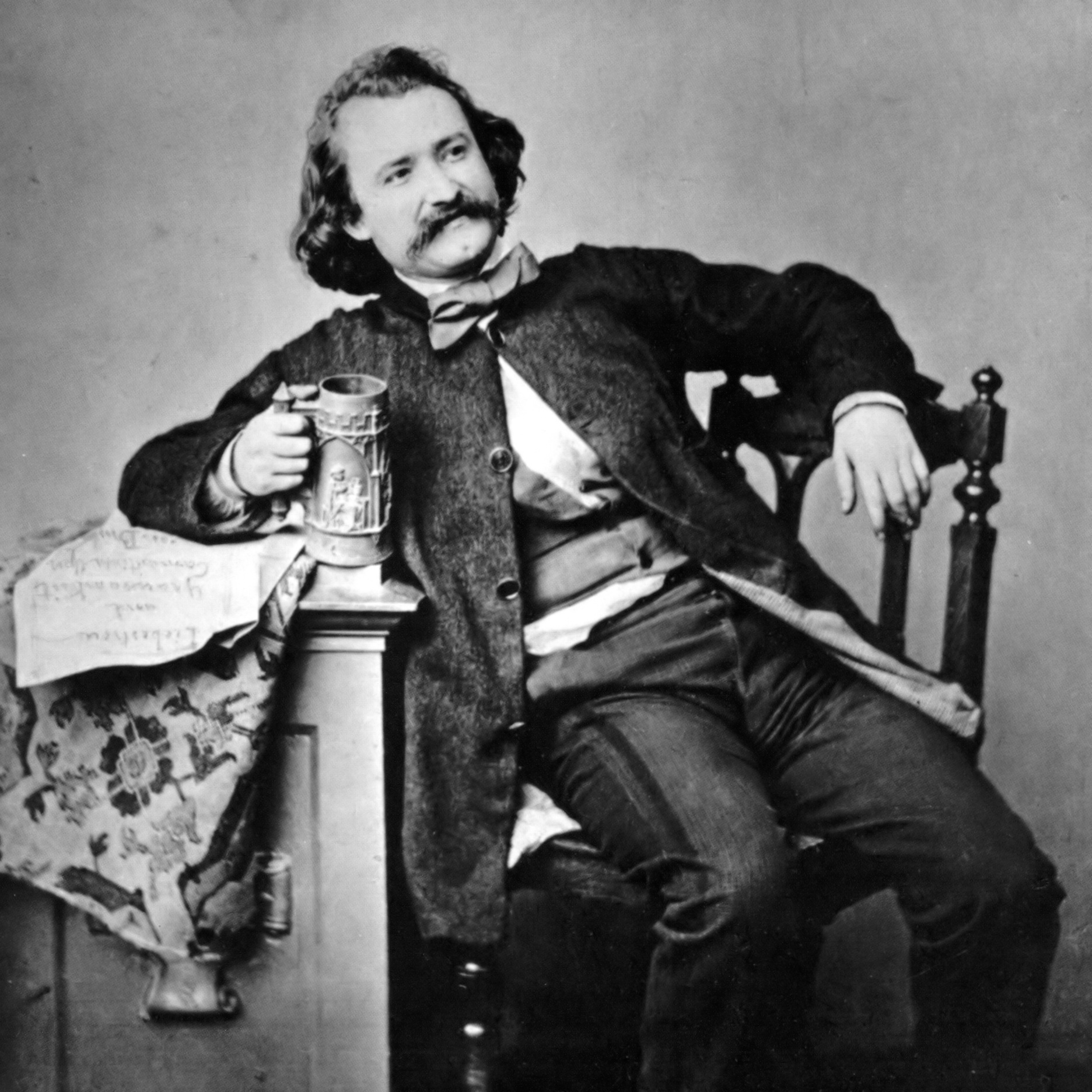
Wilhelm Busch

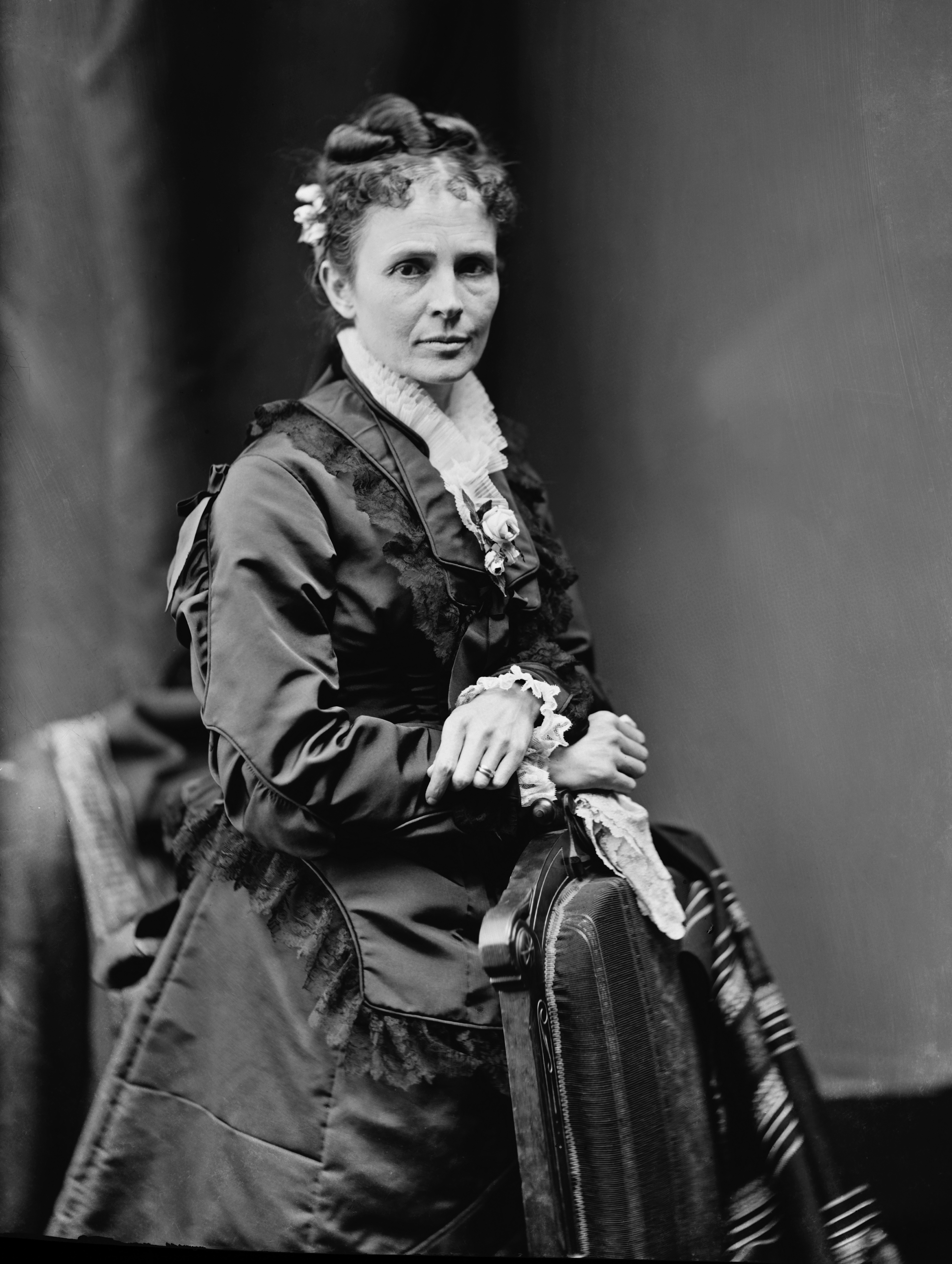
Lucretia Garfield

- March 4 – Samuel Colman, American painter, interior designer, and writer (d. 1920)
- March 7 – Carl Neumann, German mathematician (d. 1925)
- March 10 – John Owen Dominis, prince consort of the Kingdom of Hawaiʻi as the husband of Queen Liliʻuokalani (d. 1891)
- March 17 – Moncure D. Conway, American abolitionist minister and radical writer (d. 1907)
- March 19 – Ármin Vámbéry, Hungarian Turkologist and traveler (d. 1913)
- March 21 – Charles Altamont Doyle, illustrator, watercolourist and civil servant (d. 1893)
- March 27 – William Quiller Orchardson, Scottish portraitist (d. 1910)
- April 3 – James Sewall Reed, American soldier (d. 1864)
- April 4 – Fedor Flinzer, German author, educator and illustrator (d. 1911)
- April 5 – Jules Ferry, French premier (d. 1893)
- April 7 – Ferdinand Kittel, German missionary, Lutheran priest and indologist (d. 1903)
- April 8
  - Howell Edmunds Jackson, American politician, Associate Justice of the Supreme Court of the United States (d. 1895)
  - Alfred von Waldersee, German field marshal (d. 1904)
- April 14
  - Wilhelm Busch, German humorist, poet, illustrator and painter (d. 1908)
  - James H. Ledlie, civil engineer for American railroads and a general in the Union Army (d. 1882)
- April 15 – John Irwin, American admiral (d. 1901)
- April 17 – Robert Loyd-Lindsay, British soldier, politician, and philanthropist (d. 1901)
- April 19
  - José Echegaray, Spanish writer, Nobel Prize laureate (d. 1916)
  - Lucretia Garfield, First Lady of the United States (d. 1918)

=== May–June ===
- May 7 – Heinrich Julius Holtzmann, German Protestant theologian (d. 1910)
- May 14
  - Charles Peace, English criminal (d. 1879)
  - Rudolf Lipschitz, German mathematician (d. 1903)
- May 20 – Garretson W. Gibson, 14th president of Liberia (d. 1910)
- May 21
  - Hudson Taylor, English founder of the China Inland Mission (d. 1905)
  - Edwin Warren Moïse, Jewish-American lawyer, Confederate officer, and Adjutant-General from South Carolina (d. 1902)
- May 22 – Laura Gundersen, Norwegian actor (d. 1898)
- March 26 – Michel Bréal, French philologist (d. 1915)
- May 27 – Alexandr Aksakov, Russian writer (d. 1903)
- May 28 – Heinrich XIV, Prince Reuss Younger Line from 1867 to 1913 (d. 1913)
- June 9 – Martha Waldron Janes, American minister, suffragist, columnist (d. unknown)
- June 10 – Nicolaus Otto, German engineer (d. 1891)
- June 11 – Jules Vallès, French journalist, author, and left-wing political activist (d. 1885)
- June 12 – Pierre Théoma Boisrond-Canal, Haitian politician, 12th President of Haiti (d. 1905)
- June 17 – Sir William Crookes, English chemist, physicist (d. 1919)
- June 21
  - Louise Rayner, British watercolour artist (d. 1924)
  - Joseph Rainey, American politician, first black person in the House of Representatives (d. 1887)
- June 23 – Gustav Jäger, German naturalist and hygienist (d. 1917)
- June 29 – Rafqa Pietra Chobok, Lebanese Maronite nun who was canonized (d. 1914)

=== July–August ===
- July 1 – Karl Binz, German physician and pharmacologist (d. 1913)
- July 5 – Pavel Chistyakov, Russian painter and art teacher (d. 1919)
- July 6 – Emperor Maximilian I of Mexico (d. 1867)
- July 10 – Alvan Graham Clark, American astronomer and telescope-maker (d. 1897)
- July 11 – Charilaos Trikoupis, 7-time Prime Minister of Greece (d. 1896)
- July 19 – Julius von Verdy du Vernois, German general and staff officer (d. 1910)
- July 22 – Colin Archer, Norwegian naval architect and shipbuilder (d. 1921)
- July 26 – Joseph P. Fyffe, American admiral (d. 1896)
- July 29 – Luigi Palma di Cesnola, Italian-American soldier, diplomat and archaeologist (d. 1904)
- August 2 – Henry Steel Olcott, American officer (d. 1907)
- August 3 – Edward Wilmot Blyden, Americo-Liberian educator, writer, diplomat, and politician (d. 1912)
- August 7 – Max Lange, German chess player and problem composer (d. 1899)
- August 8 – George, King of Saxony (d. 1904)
- August 9 – Alexander von Monts, officer in the Prussian Navy and later the German Imperial Navy (d. 1889)
- August 13 – George F. Robinson, American soldier (d. 1907)
- August 16 – Wilhelm Wundt, German physiologist, philosopher, and professor, and pioneer of modern psychology (d. 1920)
- August 20 – Thaddeus S. C. Lowe, American aeronaut, scientist and inventor (d. 1913)
- August 26 – Charles DeRudio, Italian aristocrat and U.S. Army officer (d. 1910)

=== September–October ===
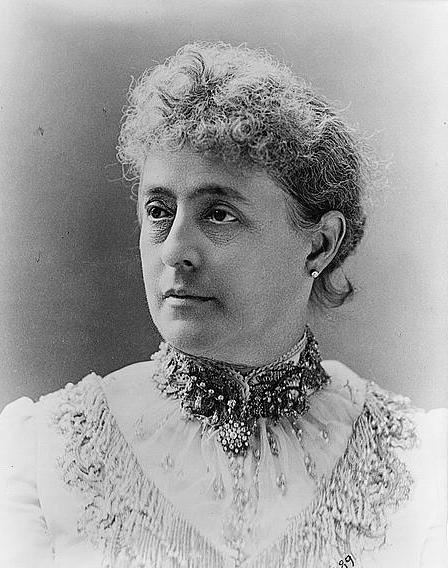
Caroline Harrison

- September 1 – Hermann Steudner, botanist and an explorer of Africa (d.1863)
- September 10 – Randall L. Gibson, American politician and general in the Confederate Army (d. 1892)
- September 14 – Henry Steers, son of James Rich Steers, nephew of George Steers, proprietor of Henry Steers' Ship Yard (d. 1903)
- September 20 – Prince Nikolaus Wilhelm of Nassau (d. 1905)
- September 21 – Louis Paul Cailletet, French physicist and inventor (d. 1913)
- September 22 – John Smith, nephew of Joseph Smith, the founder of The Church of Jesus Christ of Latter Day Saints and the fifth Presiding Patriarch of LDS Church (d. 1911)
- September 25 – William Le Baron Jenney, American architect and engineer(d. 1907)
- September 30 – Frederick Roberts, 1st Earl Roberts, British Victorian era general (d. 1914)
- October 1
  - Caroline Harrison, First Lady of the United States (d. 1892)
  - Henry Clay Work, American composer and songwriter (d. 1884)
- October 2
  - Sir Edward Tylor, English anthropologist (d. 1917)
  - Julius von Sachs, German botanist (d. 1897)
- October 3 – Richard Meade, Lord Gilford, British admiral (d. 1907)
- October 4 – Thorborg Rappe, Swedish social reformer (d. 1902)
- October 6
  - August Eisenlohr, German egyptologist (d. 1902)
  - Christian Mali, German painter and art professor (d. 1906)
- October 7 – William Thomas Blanford, English geologist and naturalist (d. 1905)
- October 10 – Joe Cain, American parade organizer for Mardi Gras in Mobile, Alabama (d. 1904)
- October 15 - Hugh Ryves Baker, Church of England priest and founder of St Michael's Woolwich (d. 1898)
- October 16 – George Crockett Strong, Union brigadier general in the American Civil War(d. 1863)
- October 21 – Gustav Langenscheidt, German publisher (died 1895)
- October 22 – Robert Eitner, German musicologist, researcher and bibliographer (died 1905)
- October 23
  - Grand Duke Michael Nikolaevich of Russia, fourth son and seventh child of Tsar Nicholas I of Russia and Charlotte of Prussia (d. 1909)
  - Johan Gabriel Ståhlberg, Finnish priest and father of K. J. Ståhlberg, the first President of Finland (d. 1873)
  - William Hulbert, American professional baseball executive who was one of the founders of the National League (d. 1882)
- October 25 – Grand Duke Michael Nikolaevich of Russia, Russian noble, child of Emperor Nicholas I and Charlotte of Prussia (d. 1909)
- October 29 – Narcisa de Jesús, Ecuadorian-born philanthropist, lay hermit, sainted (d. 1869)

=== November–December ===
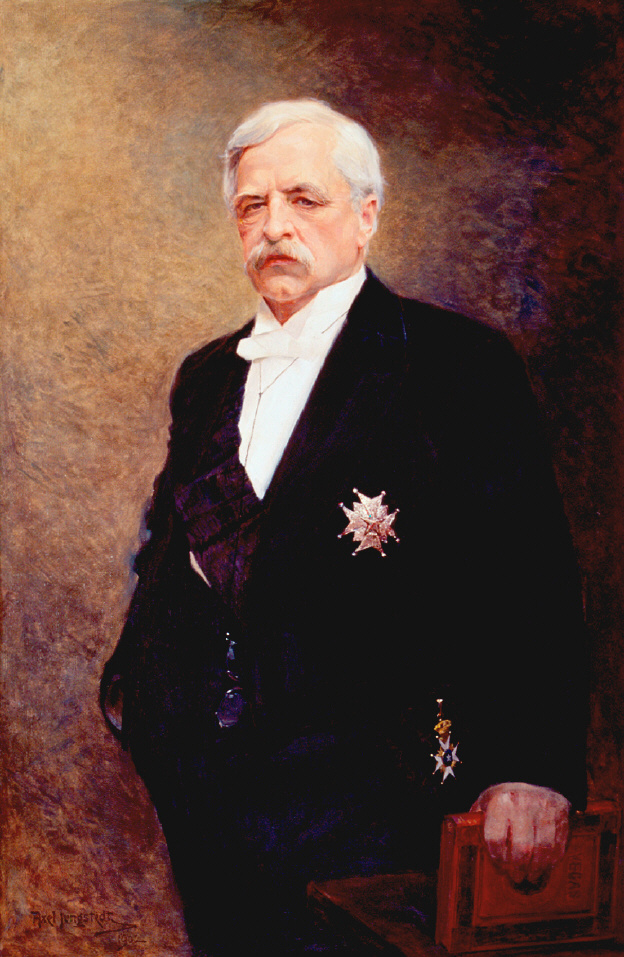
Adolf Erik Nordenskiöld

- November 1 – Gyula Szapáry, Hungarian politician, 10th Prime Minister of Hungary (d. 1905)
- November 3 – Hubert de Burgh-Canning, 2nd Marquess of Clanricarde (d. 1916)
- November 7 – Andrew Dickson White, American historian, diplomat and co-founder of Cornell University (d. 1918)
- November 9 – Émile Gaboriau, French writer, novelist, journalist, and a pioneer of detective fiction (d. 1873)
- November 10 – Samuel McKee, Colonel for the Union Army and served in the Third Kentucky Volunteer Infantry (d. 1862)
- November 12 – Nancy Edberg, Swedish pioneer of women's swimming (d. 1892)
- November 15 – Hermann Ottomar Herzog, German-American painter (d. 1932)
- November 18 – Adolf Erik Nordenskiöld, Finnish-Swedish geologist and explorer (d. 1901)
- November 26 – Mary Edwards Walker, American physician (d. 1919)
- November 28 – Sir Leslie Stephen, English writer, critic (d. 1904)
- November 29 – Louisa May Alcott, American author (d. 1888)
- December 6 – Thaddeus C. Pound, American businessman and politician (d. 1914)
- December 8
  - Bjørnstjerne Bjørnson, Norwegian author, Nobel Prize laureate (d. 1910)
  - G. A. Henty, English novelist and war correspondent (d. 1902)
- December 11 – Nancy Edberg, Swedish swimmer, swimming instructor and bath house manager (d. 1892)
- December 13 – Alexander Milton Ross, Canadian abolitionist (d. 1897)
- December 14 – Ana Betancourt, Cuban national heroine (d. 1901)
- December 15 – Gustave Eiffel, French engineer (d. 1923)
- December 21 – John H. Ketcham, American politician (d. 1906)
- December 27 – Thomas Blakiston, English explorer, zoologist, and naturalist. (d. 1891)

=== Unknown date ===
- Margaret Morton Bibb, American quilter (d. 1900/1910)
- Naimuddin, Bengali writer and Islamic scholar (d. 1907)
- Turki bin Said, former Sultan of Muscat and Oman (d. 1888)
- Nikiforos Lytras, Greek painter (d. 1904)
- James James, Welsh harpist and musician (d. 1902)
- Mary Fields, American mail carrier who was the first Black woman to be employed as a star route postwoman in the United States (d. 1914)
- Jonathan (tortoise), world's oldest living land animal.

1833

=== January–June ===
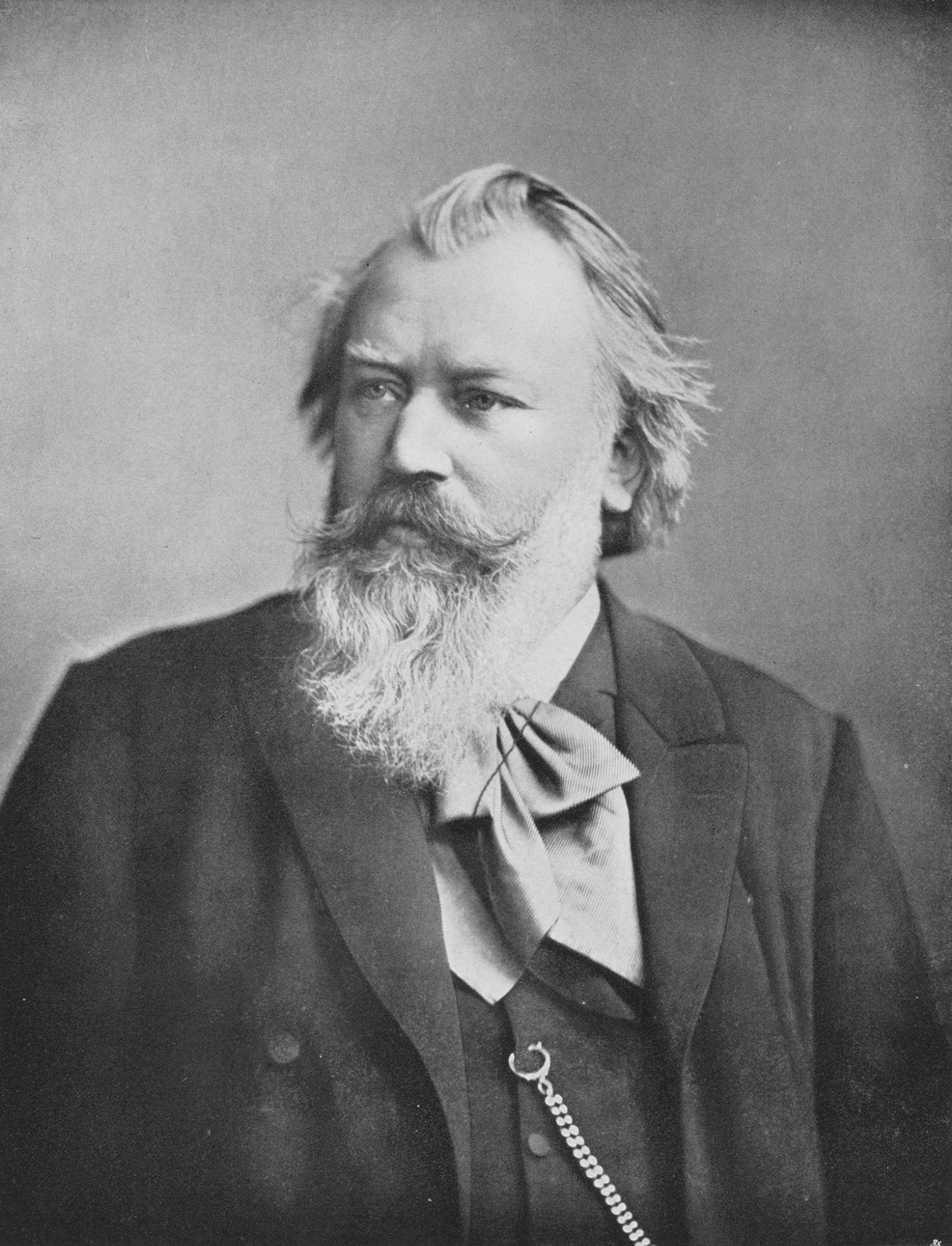
Johannes Brahms

- January 1 – Robert Lawson, New Zealand architect (d. 1902)
- January 5 – Eugene W. Hilgard, German-American "Father of soil science" (d. 1916)
- January 7 – Sir Henry Roscoe, English chemist (d. 1915)
- January 18 – Joseph S. Skerrett, American admiral (d. 1897)
- January 28 – Charles George Gordon, British army officer, administrator (d. 1885)
- February 3 – Abu Bakar of Johor, Malaysian sultan (d. 1895)
- February 6 – J. E. B. Stuart, American Confederate general (d. 1864)
- February 11 – Melville Fuller, 8th Chief Justice of the United States Supreme Court (d. 1910)
- February 19 – Élie Ducommun, Swiss journalist, activist, recipient of the Nobel Peace Prize (d. 1906)
- February 23 – Alfons Grotowski, Polish sanitary engineer (d. 1922)
- February 25 – John St. John, American temperance movement leader (d. 1916)
- February 28 – Alfred von Schlieffen, German field marshal (d. 1913)
- March 10 – Dimitrie Sturdza, 4-time prime minister of Romania (d. 1914)
- March 14 – Lucy Hobbs Taylor, American dentist (d. 1910)
- March 15 – Géza Fejérváry, 16th Prime Minister of Hungary (d. 1914)
- March 20 – Daniel Dunglas Home, Scottish medium (d. 1886)
- March 22 – Manuel Ruiz Zorrilla, Prime Minister of Spain (d. 1895)
- April 6 – Luis Cordero Crespo, 14th President of Ecuador (d. 1912)
- April 11 – Fredrik von Otter, 8th Prime Minister of Sweden (d. 1910)
- May 5 – Lazarus Fuchs, German mathematician (d. 1902)
- May 7 – Johannes Brahms, German composer (d. 1897)
- May 9 – Hermann von Spaun, Austro-Hungarian admiral (d. 1919)
- May 26 – Edward William Godwin, English architect (d. 1886)
- June 1 – John Marshall Harlan, Associate Justice of the Supreme Court of the United States (d. 1911)
- June 4 – Garnet Wolseley, 1st Viscount Wolseley, British field marshal (d. 1913)
- June 21 – Domenico Morea, Italian priest, educator and historian (d. 1902)
- June 24
  - Gustaf Åkerhielm, 6th Prime Minister of Sweden (d. 1900)
  - Alfred William Bennett, English botanist (d. 1902)

=== July–December ===
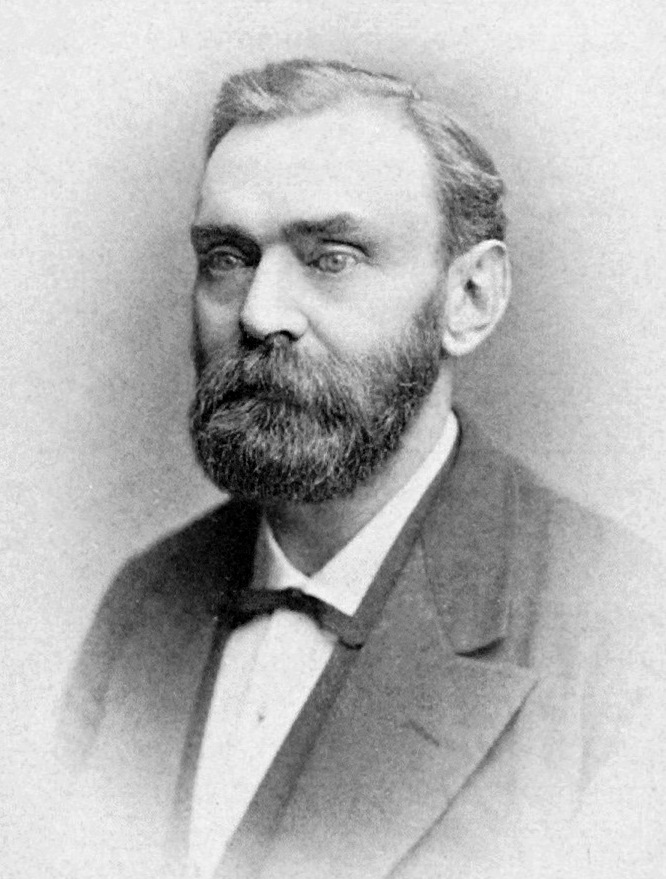
Alfred Nobel

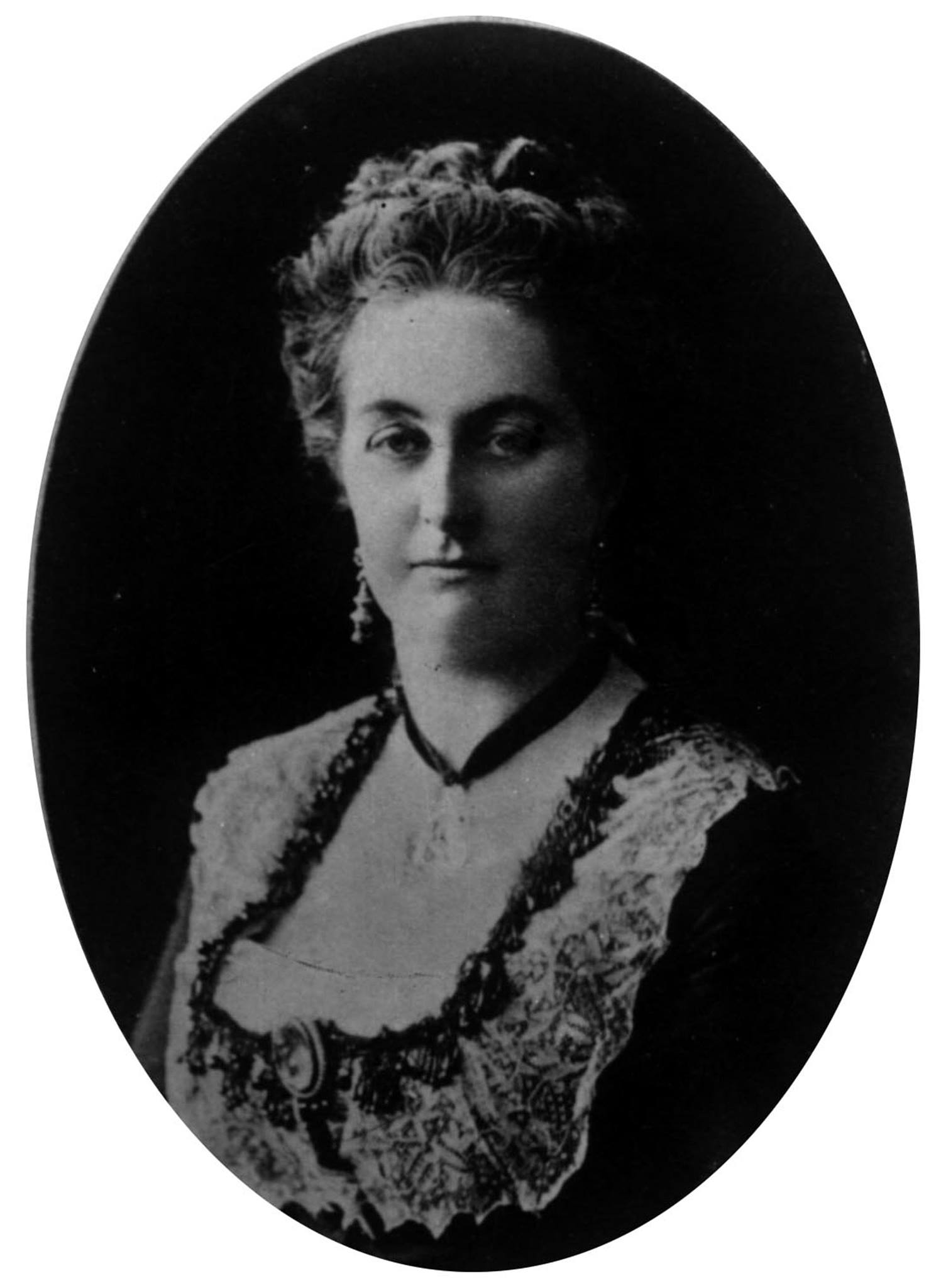
Eliza Lynch

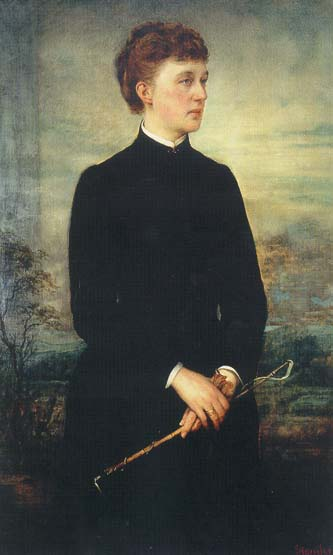
Princess Adelheid-Marie of Anhalt-Dessau

- July 7 – Félicien Rops, Belgian artist (d. 1898)
- July 14 – Alfred Biliotti, Italian Levantine British consular officer and archaeologist (d. 1915)
- July 26 – Gheorghe Manu, 17th Prime Minister of Romania (d. 1911)
- July 27 – Thomas George Bonney, English geologist (d. 1923)
- August 3 – Auguste Schmidt, German educator, women's rights activist (d. 1902)
- August 9 – Emily Pepys, English child diarist (d. 1877)
- August 16 – Eliza Ann Otis, American poet, newspaper publisher and philanthropist (d. 1904)
- August 20 – Benjamin Harrison, 23rd President of the United States (d. 1901)
- August 31 – Carlo Alberto Racchia, Italian admiral and politician (d. 1896)
- September 2 – Henry Hotze, Swiss American Confederate propagandist (d. 1887)
- September 20 – Ernesto Teodoro Moneta, Italian pacifist, recipient of the Nobel Peace Prize (d. 1918)
- September 22 – Gheorghe Grigore Cantacuzino, twice Prime Minister of Romania (d. 1913)
- October 2 – William Corby, American Catholic priest (d. 1897)
- October 20 – Mary F. Eastman, American educator, lecturer, writer and suffragist (d. 1908)
- October 21 – Alfred Nobel, Swedish inventor of dynamite, creator of the Nobel Prize (d. 1896)
- October 23 – Antonio Flores Jijón, 13th President of Ecuador (d. 1915)
- November 6 – Jonas Lie, Norwegian author (d. 1908)
- November 9 – Émile Gaboriau, French writer (d. 1873)
- November 12 – Alexander Borodin, Russian composer (d. 1887)
- November 13 – Edwin Booth, American tragedian (d. 1893)
- November 14 – Sir Hugh Gough, British general, Victoria Cross recipient (d. 1909)
- November 19 – Eliza Lynch, First Lady of Paraguay (d. 1886)
- November 27 – Princess Mary Adelaide of Cambridge (d. 1897)
- November 30 – Frederick Richards British admiral (d. 1912)
- December 7 – Rodrigo Augusto da Silva, Brazilian Senator, author of the Golden Law (d. 1889)
- December 13 – Petre S. Aurelian, 19th Prime Minister of Romania (d. 1909)
- December 20 – Samuel Mudd, American doctor to John Wilkes Booth (d. 1883)
- December 25 – Princess Adelheid-Marie of Anhalt-Dessau (d. 1916)

=== Date unknown ===
- Margaret Fox, American medium (d. 1893)
- Fu Shanxiang, Chinese scholar, Chancellor (d. 1864)

1834

=== January–June ===
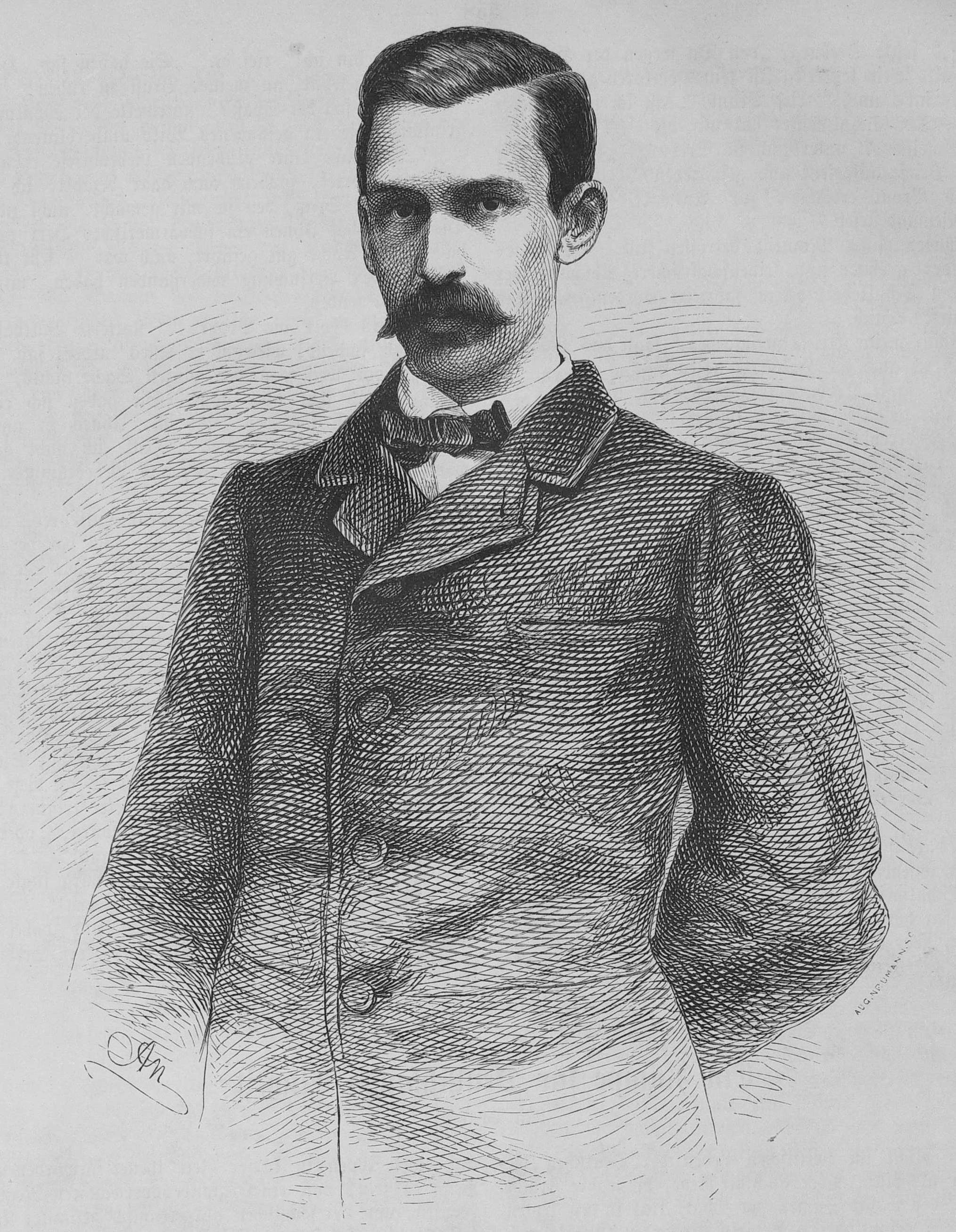
Heinrich von Treitschke

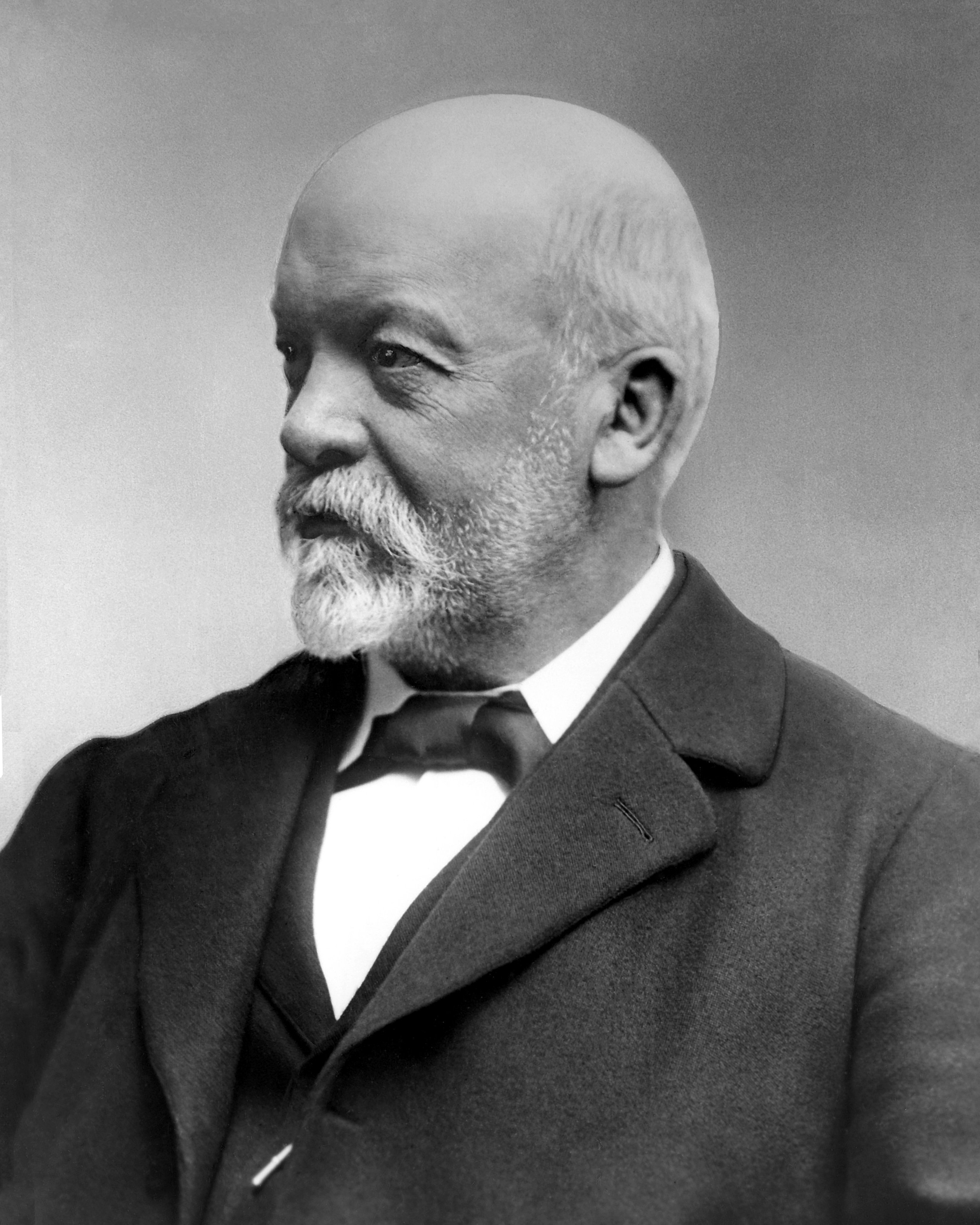
Gottlieb Daimler.

- January 7 – Johann Philipp Reis, German physicist, inventor (d. 1874)
- January 15 – Samuel Arza Davenport, American politician (d. 1911)
- January 17 – August Weismann, German evolutionary biologist (d. 1914)
- January 20 – Piet Joubert, Boer politician, military commander (d. 1900)
- January 25 – Alina Frasa, Finnish ballerina (d. 1899)
- February 6 – Edwin Klebs, German-Swiss pathologist who discovered Diphtheria (d. 1913)
- February 8 – Dmitri Mendeleev, Russian chemist (d. 1907)
- February 9 – Felix Dahn, German author (d. 1912)
- February 16 – Ernst Haeckel, German zoologist, philosopher (d. 1919)
- February 19 – Charles Davis Lucas, British Victoria Cross recipient (d. 1914)
- February 27 – Charles C. Carpenter, American admiral (d. 1899)
- March 5 – Félix de Blochausen, 6th Prime Minister of Luxembourg (d. 1915)
- March 16 – Sir James Hector, Scottish geologist (d. 1907)
- March 17 – Gottlieb Daimler, German engineer, inventor (d. 1900)
- March 20 – Charles W. Eliot, American President of Harvard University (d. 1926)
- March 23 – Julius Reubke, German composer (d. 1858)
- March 24
  - John Wesley Powell, American explorer (d. 1902)
  - William Morris, English poet, artist (d. 1896)
- April 2 – Paškal Buconjić, Herzegovinian Catholic bishop (d. 1910)
- April 26 – Artemus Ward, American humorist (d. 1867)
- May 20 – Albert Niemann, German chemist (d. 1861)
- May 23 – Carl Heinrich Bloch, Danish sculptor (d. 1890)
- June 19 – Charles Spurgeon, English Baptist preacher (d. 1892)

=== July–December ===
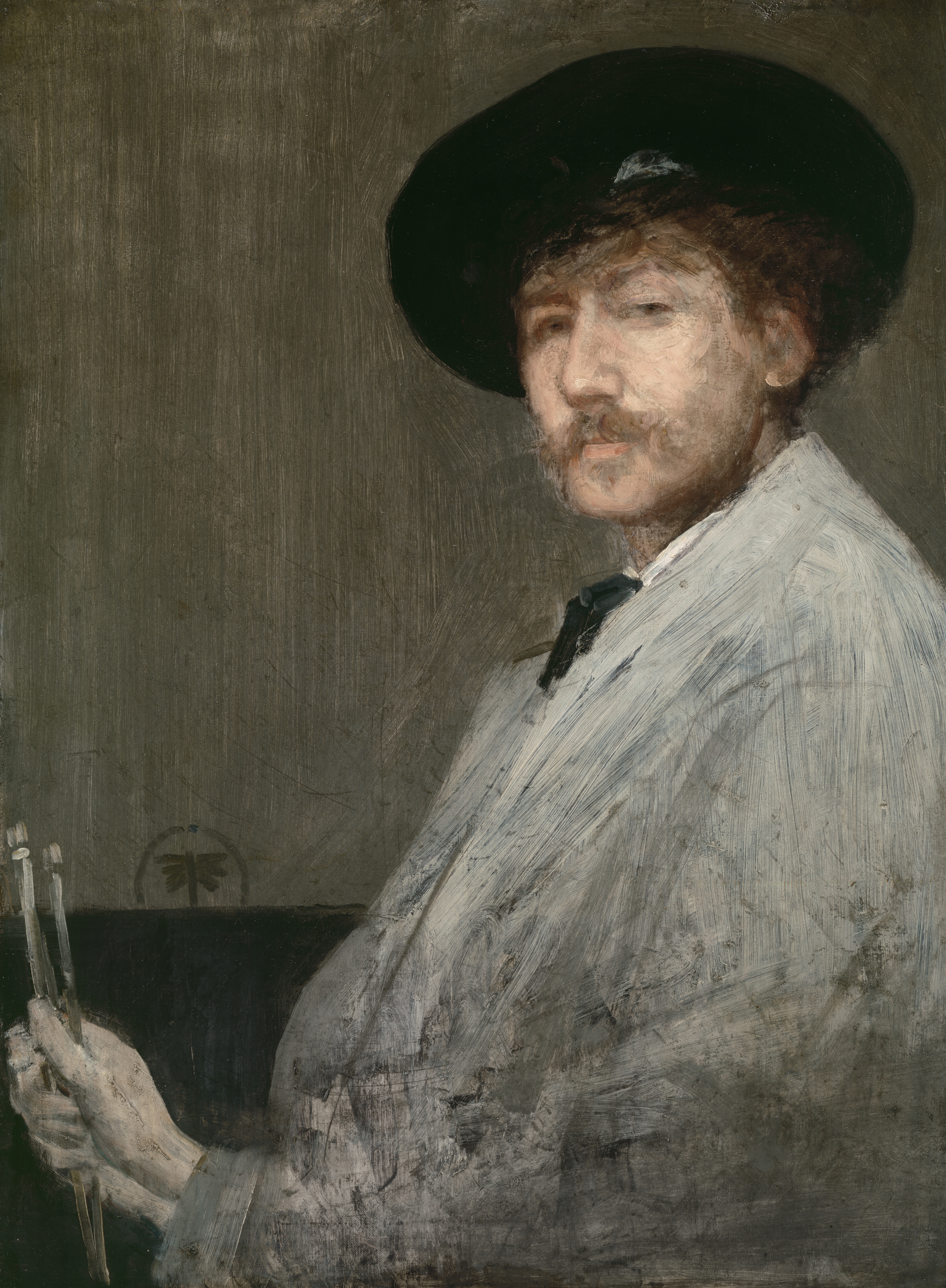
James McNeill Whistler

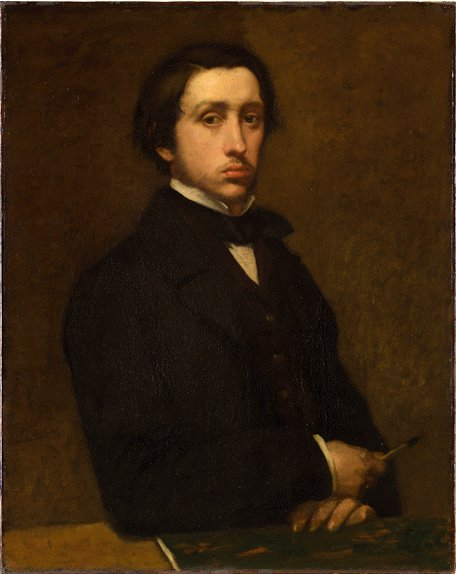
Edgar Degas

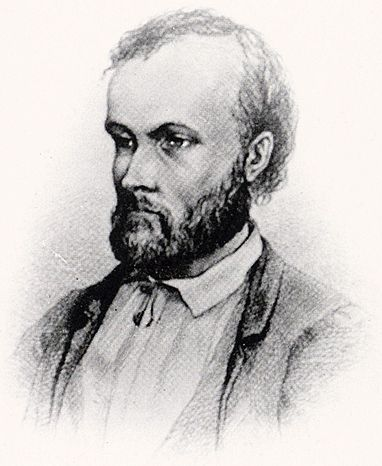
Aleksis Kivi

- July 2 – Hendrick Peter Godfried Quack, Dutch economist, historian (d. 1917)
- July 4 – Christopher Dresser, British designer influential in the Anglo-Japanese style (d. 1904)
- July 10 – James McNeill Whistler, American painter, etcher (d. 1903)
- July 19 – Edgar Degas, French painter (d. 1917)
- July 2 – Frédéric Auguste Bartholdi, French sculptor (d. 1904)
- July 27 – Miguel Grau Seminario, Peruvian admiral (d. 1879)
- August 4 – John Venn, British mathematician (d. 1923)
- August 22 – Samuel Pierpont Langley, American astronomer, physicist, and aeronautics pioneer (d. 1906)
- August 31 – Amilcare Ponchielli, Italian composer (d. 1886)
- Heinrich von Treitschke (15 September 1834 – 28 April 1896) German historian, political writer, and National Liberal member of the Reichstag during the time of the German Empire.
- September 17 – Robert Simpson, Scottish-Canadian businessman (d. 1897)
- September 28 – William Montrose Graham Jr., American general (d. 1916)
- September 30 – Louis P. Mouillard, French artist, aviation pioneer (d. 1897)
- October 6 – Walter Kittredge, American composer (d. 1905)
- October 10 – Aleksis Kivi, Finnish national author (d. 1872)
- November 8 – Johann Karl Friedrich Zöllner, German astrophysicist (d. 1882)
- November 13 – Ignacio Manuel Altamirano, Mexican writer (d. 1893)
- November 19 – Georg Hermann Quincke, German physicist (d. 1924)
- November 21 – Hetty Green, American businesswoman (d. 1916)
- November 28 – Sophronia Farrington Naylor Grubb, American activist (d. 1902)
- December 16 – Léon Walras, French economist (d. 1910)
- December 24 – Augustus George Vernon Harcourt, English chemist (d. 1919)

=== Date unknown ===
- Joseph Welland, Irish missionary and Reverend (d. 1879)

1835

=== January–June ===
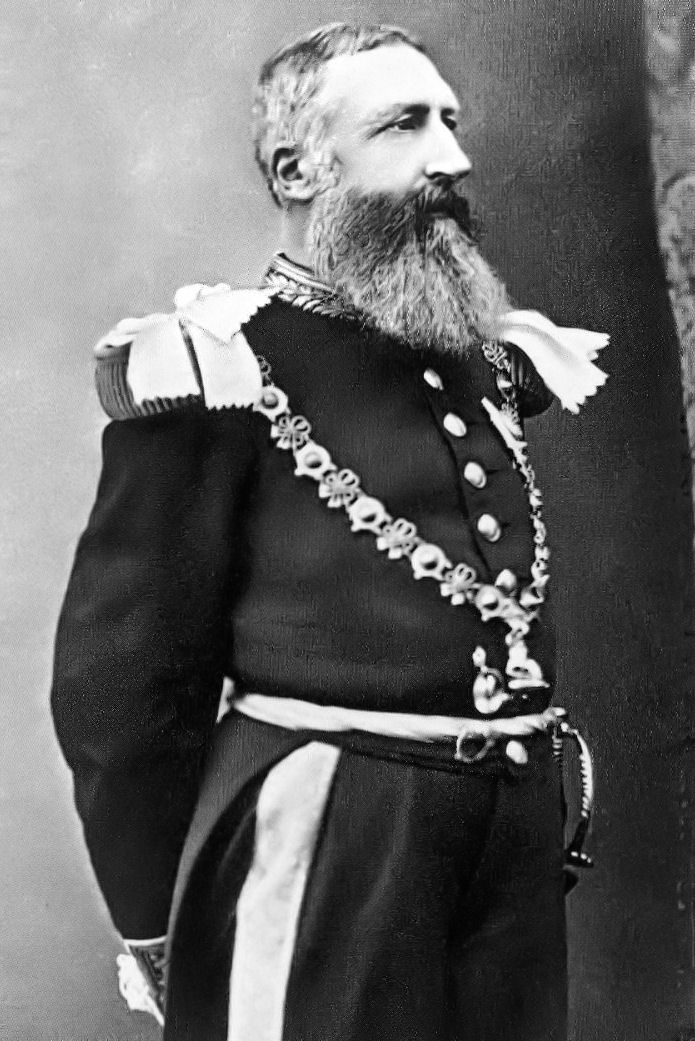
Leopold II of Belgium

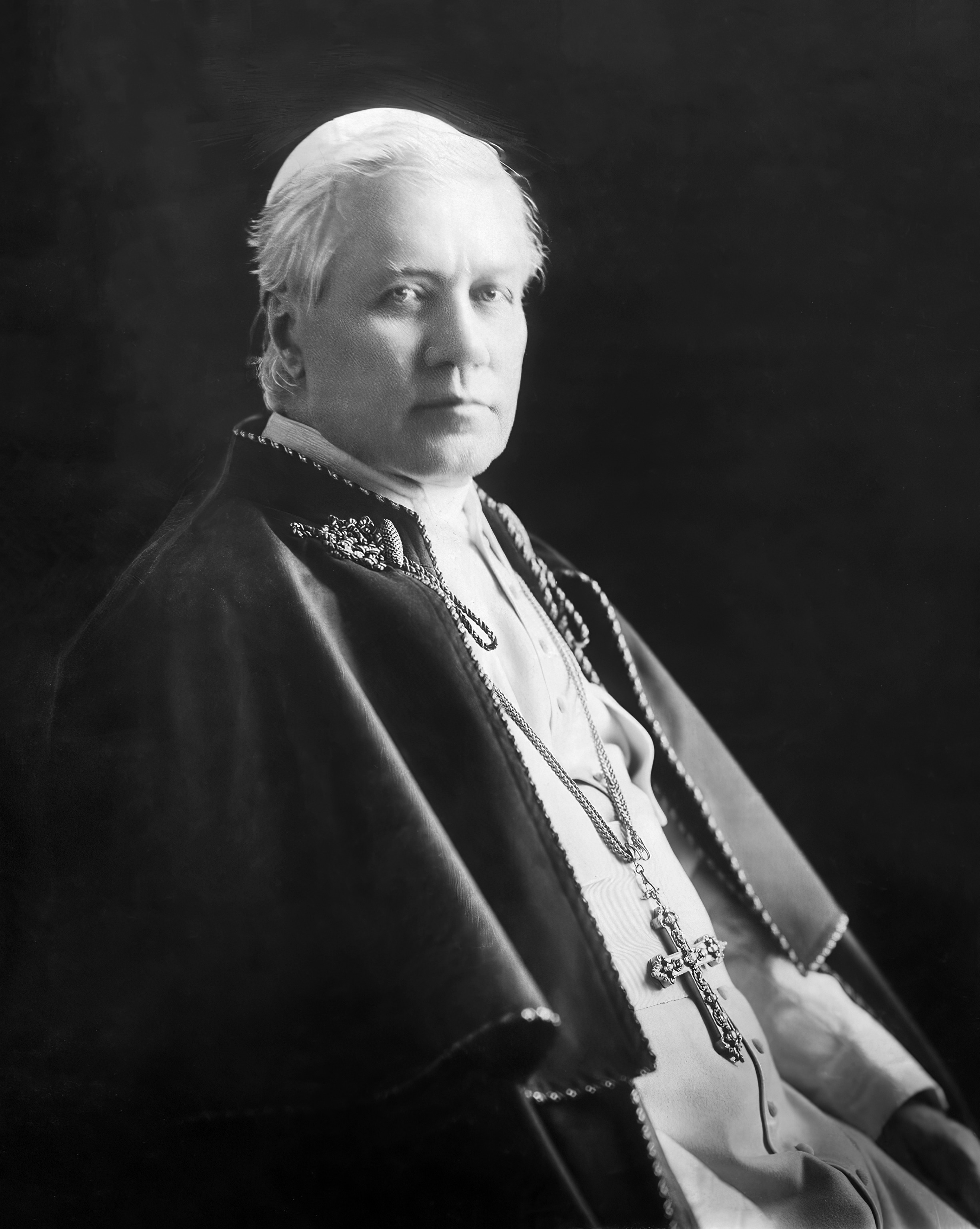
Pope Pius X

- January 14 – Emmy Rappe, Swedish nurse pioneer (d. 1896)
- February 13 – Mirza Ghulam Ahmad, founder of the Ahmadiyya Muslim Community (d. 1908)
- February 15
  - Demetrius Vikelas, Greek International Olympic Committee president (d. 1908)
  - Nguyễn Khuyến, Vietnamese Ruist scholar, poet and teacher (d. 1910)
- February 18 – César Cui, Lithuanian composer (d. 1918)
- February 22 – Jeannette Walworth, American novelist, journalist (d. 1918)
- March 12
  - Simon Newcomb, Canadian-American astronomer (d. 1909)
  - Sigismondo Savona, Maltese educator and politician (d. 1908)
- March 14 – Giovanni Schiaparelli, Italian astronomer (d. 1910)
- March 15 – Eduard Strauss, Austrian composer (d. 1916)
- March 21 – Maria Magdalena Mathsdotter, Swedish Sami educator (d. 1873)
- March 24 – Josef Stefan, Slovenian physicist, mathematician, and poet (d. 1893)
- April 1 – James Fisk, American entrepreneur (d. 1872)
- April 4 – John Hughlings Jackson, English neurologist (d. 1911)
- April 9 – King Leopold II of Belgium (d. 1909)
- May 3 – Alfred Austin, English poet (d. 1913)
- May 18 – Charles N. Sims, American Methodist preacher, third chancellor of Syracuse University (d. 1908)
- May 21 – František Chvostek, Moravian physician (d. 1884)
- June 2 – Pope Pius X (d. 1914)
- June 6 – Ștefan Fălcoianu, Romanian general and politician (d. 1905)
- June 9 – Ramón Barros Luco, 15th President of Chile (d. 1919)
- June 10 – Ferdinand IV, Grand Duke of Tuscany, (d. 1908)
- June 12 – George Atzerodt, conspirator with John Wilkes Booth, assigned to assassinate Vice President Andrew Johnson (d. 1865)
- June 15 – Adah Isaacs Menken, American actress (d. 1868)
- June 23 – Fanny Eaton, Jamaican-born artists model and domestic worker (d. 1924)
- June 24 – Johannes Wislicenus, German chemist (d. 1902)
- June 26 – Thomas W. Knox, American author, journalist (d. 1896)

=== July–December ===
Adolf von Baeyer

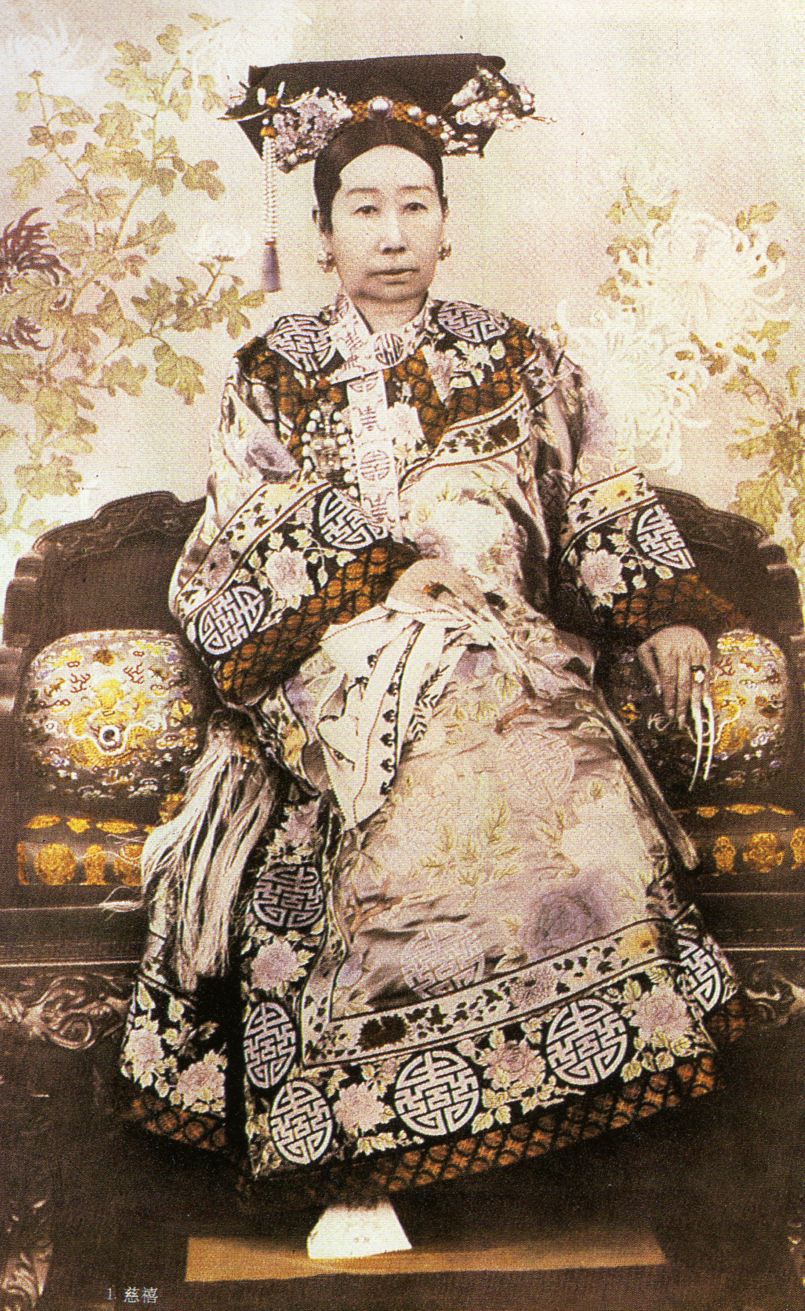
Empress Dowager Cixi

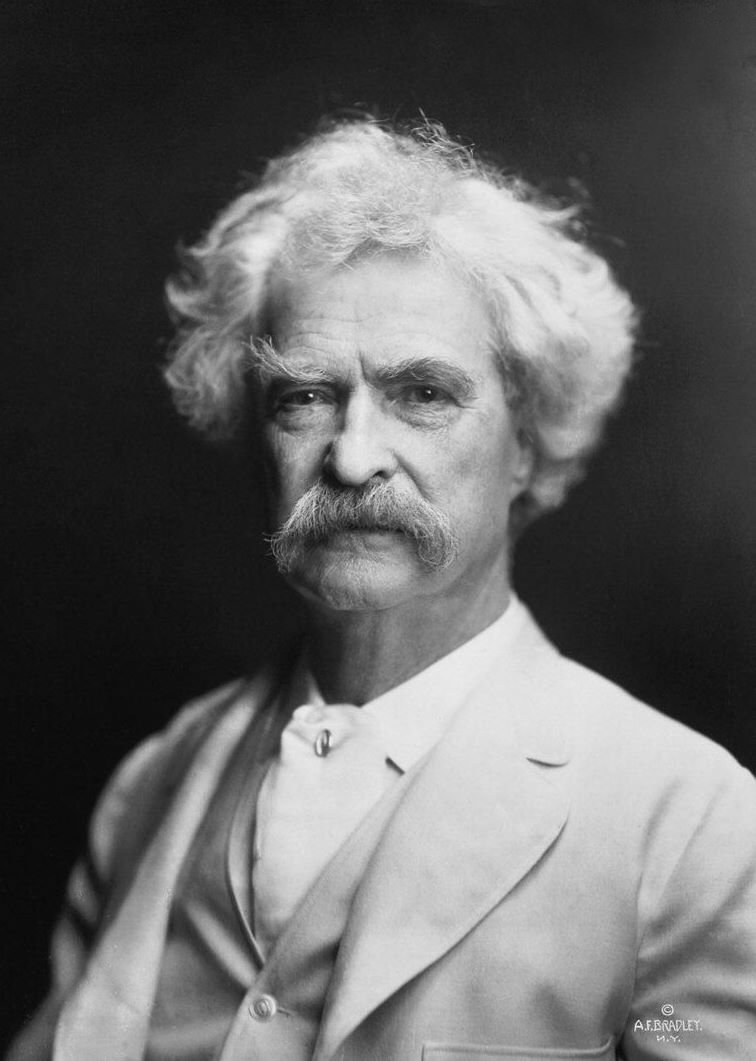
Mark Twain

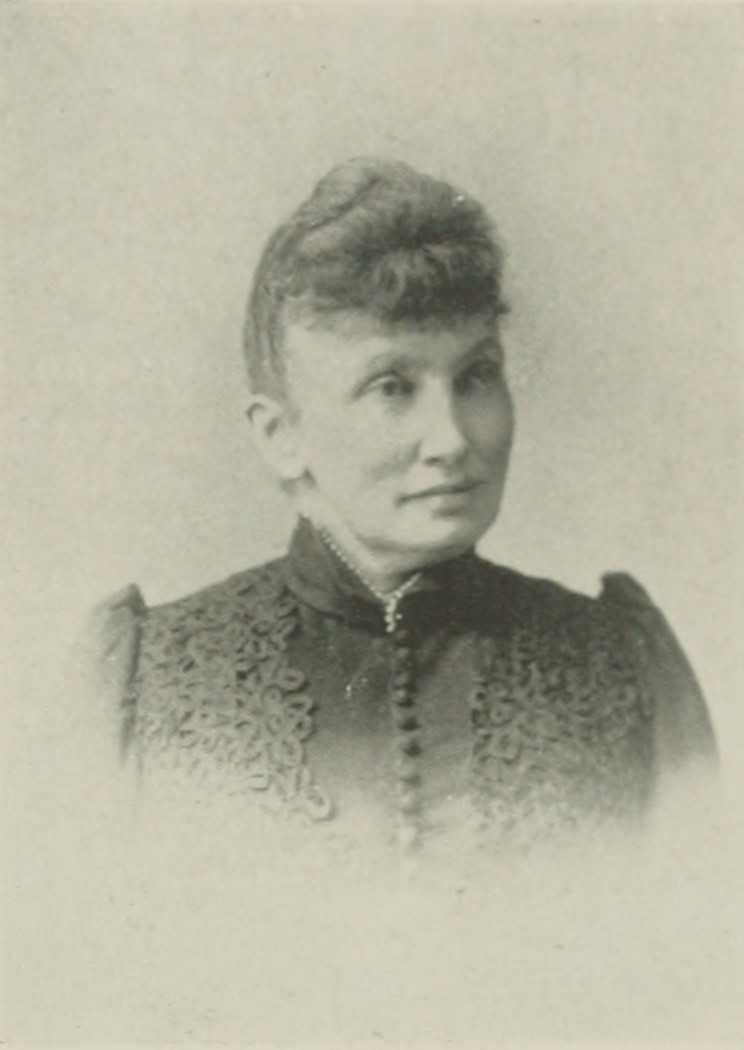
Matilda Carse

- July 6 – Sir George White, British field marshal (d. 1912)
- July 7 – Ernest Giles, Australian explorer (d. 1897)
- July 10 – Henryk Wieniawski, Polish composer (d. 1880)
- July 19 – Justo Rufino Barrios, 9th President of Guatemala (d. 1885)
- July 27 – Giosuè Carducci, Italian writer, Nobel Prize laureate (d. 1907)
- July 30 – Edmund Francis Dunne, American politician, jurist, and Catholic orator (d. 1904)
- July 31 – Henri Brisson, 2-time prime minister of France (d. 1912)
- August 2 – Elisha Gray, American inventor, businessman (d. 1901)
- August 6 – Hjalmar Kiærskou, Danish botanist (d. 1900)
- August 19 – Tom Wills, Australian cricketer, pioneer of Australian rules football (d. 1880)
- August 27 – Thomas Burberry, English businessman, inventor (d. 1926)
- September 1 – Raphael Kalinowski, Polish Discalced Carmelite friar, saint (d. 1907)
- October 7 – Felix Draeseke, German composer (d. 1913)
- October 9 – Camille Saint-Saëns, French composer (d. 1921)
- October 16 – William Rufus Shafter, American general (d. 1906)
- October 23 – Adlai Stevenson I, American lawyer and politician, 23rd Vice President of the United States (d. 1914)
- October 31 – Adolf von Baeyer, German chemist, Nobel Prize laureate (d. 1917)
- November 6 – Cesare Lombroso, Italian criminologist (d. 1909)
- November 17 – Andrew L. Harris, American Civil War hero, Governor of Ohio (d. 1915)
- November 19 – Matilda Carse, Irish-born American businesswoman, social reformer (d. 1917)
- November 21 – Rose Eytinge, American actress (d. 1911)
- November 25
  - Andrew Carnegie, American industrialist, philanthropist (d. 1919)
  - Arthur Sewall, American politician, industrialist (d. 1900)
- November 29 – Empress Dowager Cixi of China (d. 1908)
- November 30 – Mark Twain, American author, humorist (d. 1910)
- December 4 – Samuel Butler, English writer (d. 1902)
- December 6 – Wilhelm Rudolph Fittig, German chemist (d. 1910)
- December 17 – Alexander Emanuel Agassiz, American scientist (d. 1910)
- December 18 – Lyman Abbott, American clergyman, author (d. 1922)
- December 28 – Sir Archibald Geikie, Scottish geologist (d. 1924)

1836

=== January–June ===
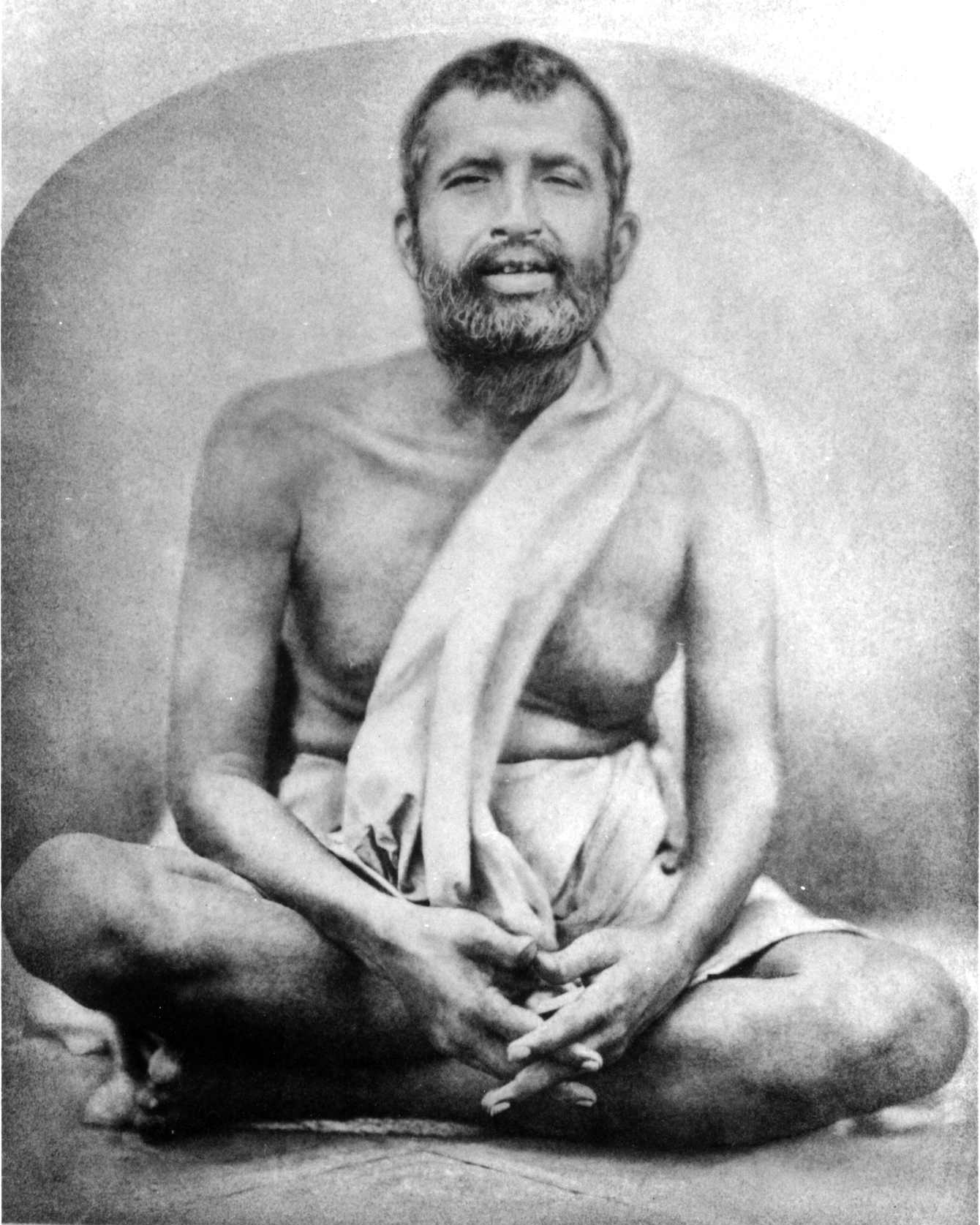
Ramakrishna

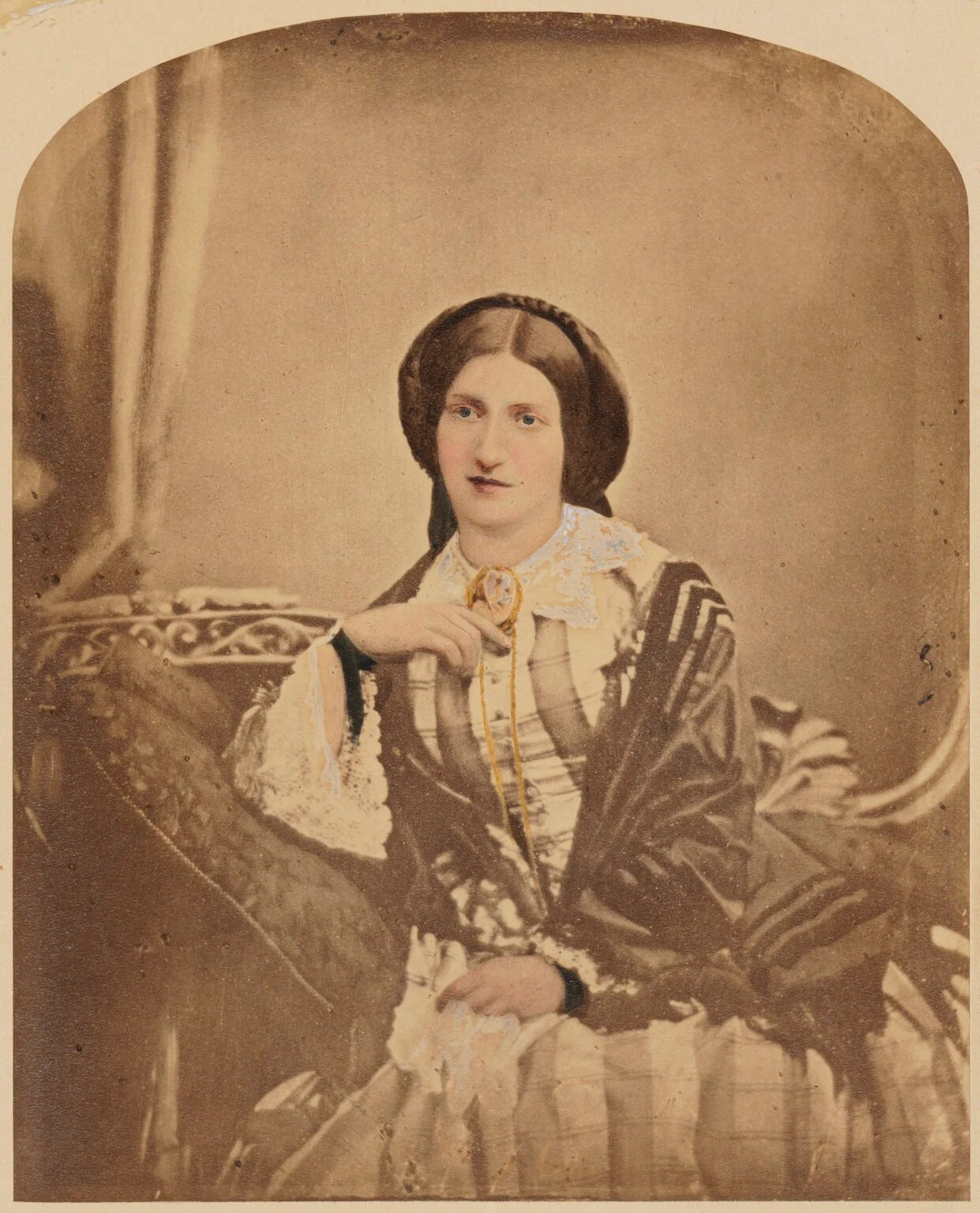
Isabella Beeton

- January 2 – Mendele Mocher Sforim, Russian Yiddish writer (d. 1917)
- January 8 – Sir Lawrence Alma-Tadema, Dutch-English painter (d. 1912)
- January 10 – Charles Phillip Ingalls, American pioneer, father of author Laura Ingalls Wilder (d. 1902)
- January 14
  - Henri Fantin-Latour, French painter (d. 1904)
  - Hugh Judson Kilpatrick, American general, politician, and diplomat (d. 1881)
- January 24 – Signe Rink, Greenland-born Danish writer, ethnologist (d. 1909)
- January 27 – Leopold von Sacher-Masoch, Austrian writer for whom masochism is named (d. 1895)
- February 5 – Tenshoin, wife of 13th Shōgun of Japan, Tokugawa Iesada (d.1883)
- February 16 – Robert Halpin, Irish mariner, cable layer (d. 1894)
- February 18 – Ramakrishna Paramhansa, Indian religious leader (d. 1886)
- February 21 – Léo Delibes, French composer (d. 1891)
- February 24 – Winslow Homer, American painter (d. 1910)
- March 2 – Henry Billings Brown, Associate Justice of the Supreme Court of the United States (d. 1913)
- March 4 – Stuart Robson, American stage comedian (d. 1903)
- March 12 – Isabella Beeton, English writer on household management (d. 1865)
- March 20 – Sir Edward Poynter, French-born British artist (d. 1919)
- March 28 – Frederick Pabst, German-American brewer (d. 1904)
- April 16 – Gootchaux Ettinger, French-Brazilian politician and industrialist (d. 1917)
- April 27 – Charles Bendire, U.S. Army captain, ornithologist (d. 1897)
- May 7 – Manuel de la Cámara y Libermoore, Spanish admiral (d. 1920)
- May 23 – Touch the Clouds, Native American chieftain (Teton Lakota Sioux) (d. 1905)
- May 26 – Mélanie de Pourtalès, French salonnière, courtier (d. 1914)
- May 27 – Jay Gould, American financier (d. 1892)
- May 28 – Friedrich Baumfelder, German composer, conductor, and pianist (d. 1916)
- May 31 – Jules Chéret, French printmaker (d. 1932)
- June 9 – Elizabeth Garrett Anderson, English physician, suffragette (d. 1910)
- June 16 – Wesley Merritt, American general (d. 1910)
- June 28 – Lyman J. Gage, American financier (d. 1927)

=== July–December ===
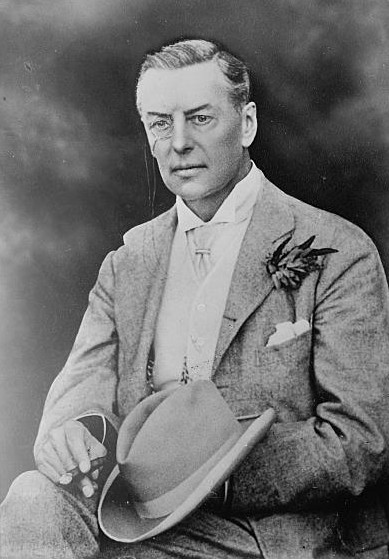
Joseph Chamberlain

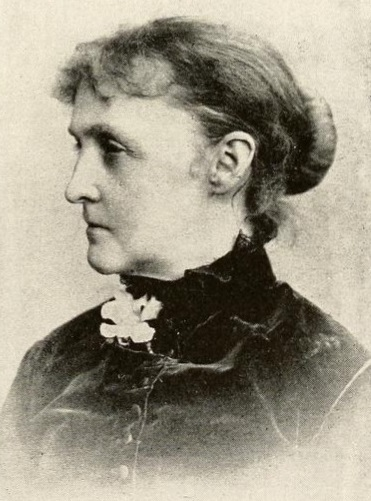
Sarah Morgan Bryan Piatt

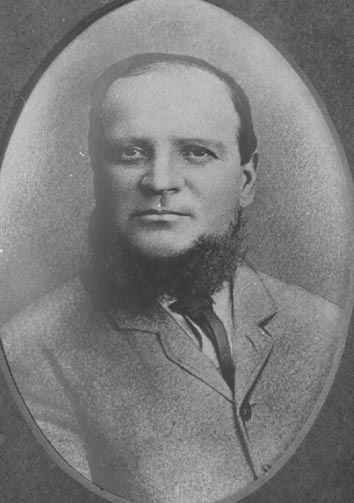
Benjamin Harris Babbidge

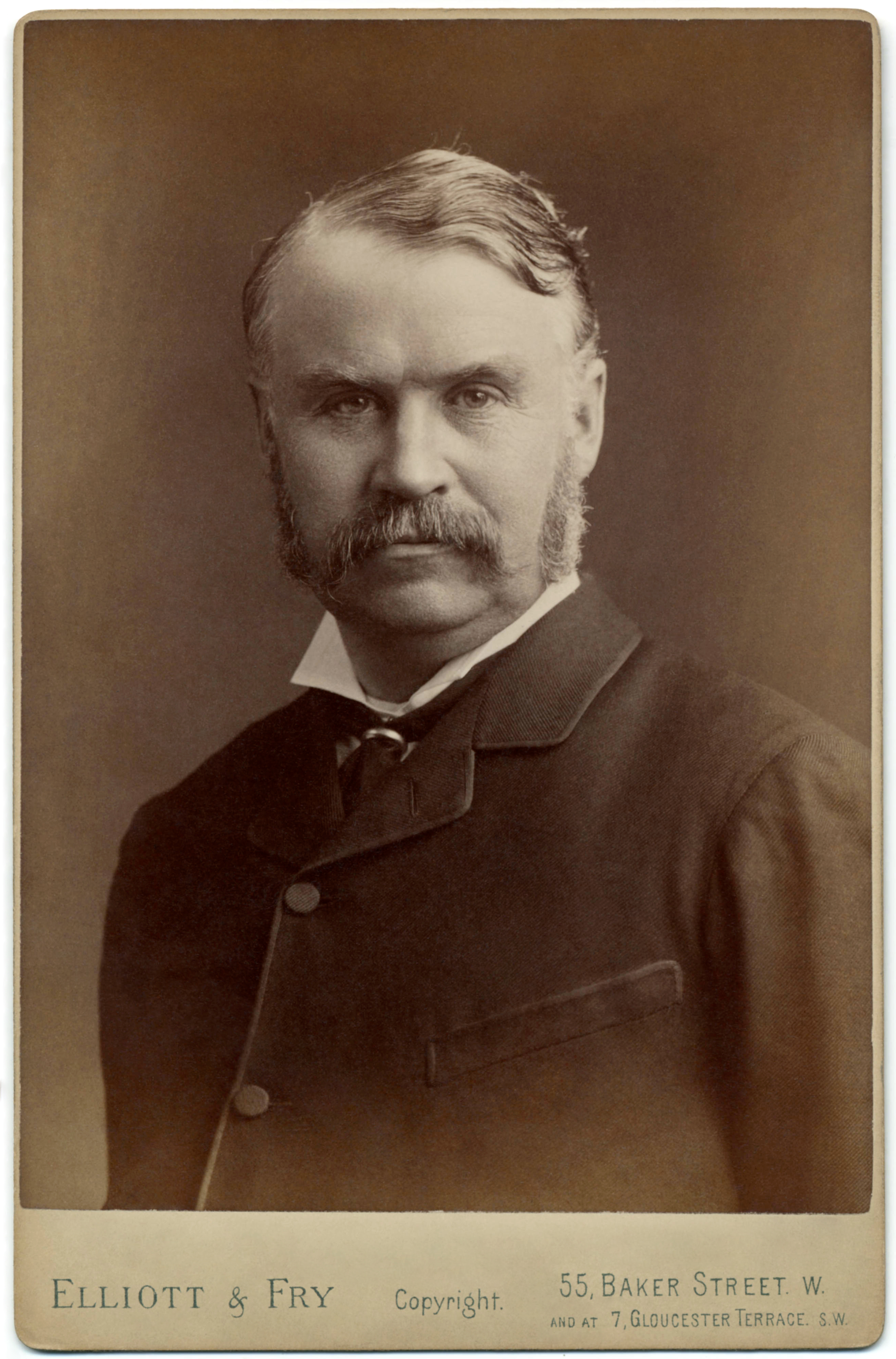
W.S. Gilbert

- July 8 – Joseph Chamberlain, British politician (d. 1914)
- July 9 – Camille of Renesse-Breidbach, Belgian nobleman, entrepreneur and author (d. 1904)
- July 24 – Jan Gotlib Bloch, Polish banker and warfare author (d. 1902)
- August 5 – John T. Raymond, American actor (d. 1887)
- August 11 – Sarah Morgan Bryan Piatt, American poet (d. 1919)
- August 13 – Bishop Nicholas of Japan, Japanese Orthodox priest (d. 1912)
- August 25 – Bret Harte, American writer (d. 1902)
- September 5 – Justiniano Borgoño, 37th Prime Minister of Peru (d. 1921)
- September 7 – Sir Henry Campbell-Bannerman, Prime Minister of the United Kingdom (d. 1908)
- September 10 – Joseph Wheeler, American general, politician (d. 1906)
- September 11 – Fitz Hugh Ludlow, American author (d. 1870)
- September 17 – William Jackson Palmer, American founder of Colorado Springs, Colorado (d. 1909)
- September 22 – Fredrique Paijkull, Swedish educator, folk high school pioneer (d. 1899)
- September 28 – Thomas Crapper, English plumber, inventor (d. 1910)
- September 30 – Remigio Morales Bermúdez, Peruvian politician, 56th President of Peru (d. 1894)
- October 2 – Benjamin Harris Babbidge, 19th Mayor of Brisbane (d. 1905)
- October 4 – Piet Cronjé, Boer general (d. 1911)
- October 5 – Enomoto Takeaki, Japanese samurai, admiral (d. 1908)
- October 6 – Heinrich Wilhelm Gottfried von Waldeyer-Hartz, German neuroanatomist (d. 1921)
- October 15 – James Tissot, French artist (d. 1902)
- October 27 – Thomas Gwyn Elger, English astronomer (d. 1897)
- November 3 – Elena Arellano Chamorro, Nicaraguan pioneer educator (d. 1911)
- November 8 – Milton Bradley, American businessman, inventor (d. 1911)
- November 10 – Andrés Avelino Cáceres, Peruvian general, twice President of Peru (d. 1923)
- November 11 – Thomas Bailey Aldrich, American poet, novelist (d. 1907)
- November 18
  - W. S. Gilbert, British playwright, librettist best known for his collaborations with Arthur Sullivan (d. 1911)
  - Máximo Gómez, Cuban military leader (d. 1905)
  - Ding Ruchang, Chinese army officer, admiral (d. 1895)
- November 22 – Sir George Barham, English businessman, founder of Express County Milk Supply Company (d. 1913)
- December 7 – Frank Manly Thorn, American lawyer, politician, essayist and journalist (d. 1907)
- December 18 – Kawamura Sumiyoshi, Japanese admiral (d. 1904)

1837

=== January–March ===
- January 2 – Mily Balakirev, Russian composer (d. 1910)
- January 7 – Thomas Henry Ismay, English shipowner (White Star Line) (d. 1899)
- February 5
  - Dwight L. Moody, American evangelist (d. 1899)
  - Edward Miner Gallaudet, American educator of the deaf (d. 1917)
- February 13 – Valentin Zubiaurre, Spanish composer (d. 1914)
- February 20 – Samuel Swett Green, American librarian, advocate (d. 1918)
- February 24 – Nakamuta Kuranosuke, Japanese admiral (d. 1916)
- March 1 – William Dean Howells, American writer, historian, editor, and politician (d. 1920)
- March 3 – Jacques Duchesne, French general (d. 1918)
- March 7 – Henry Draper, American physician and astronomer (d. 1882)
- March 18 – Grover Cleveland, 22nd and 24th President of the United States (d. 1908)
- March 22 – Virginia Oldoini, Countess of Castiglione (d. 1899)
- March 23 – Sir Charles Wyndham, English actor, theatrical manager (d. 1919)
- March 27 – Kate Fox, American medium (d. 1892)

=== April–June ===
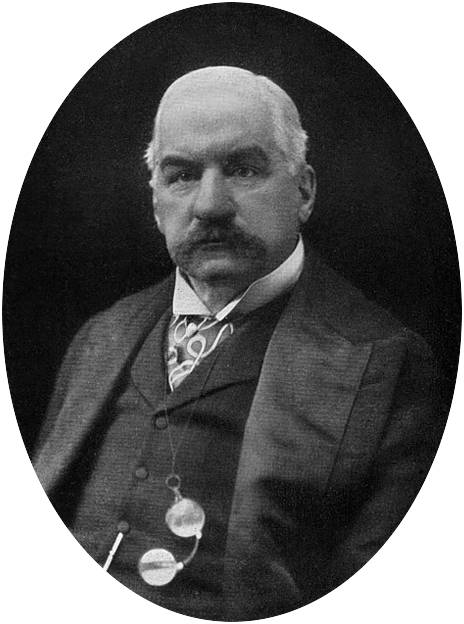
J. P. Morgan

- April 1 – Luis Francisco Benítez de Lugo y Benítez de Lugo (d. 1876)
- April 5 – Algernon Charles Swinburne, English poet (d. 1909)
- April 17 – J. P. Morgan, American financier, banker (d. 1913)
- April 21 – Fredrik Bajer, Danish politician, pacifist, recipient of the Nobel Peace Prize (d. 1922)
- April 27 – Queen Cheorin, Korean queen (d. 1878)
- April 29 – Georges Ernest Boulanger, French general, politician (d. 1891)
- May 5
  - Anna Maria Mozzoni, Italian feminist, founder of the Italian women's movement (d. 1920)
  - Theodor Rosetti, 16th Prime Minister of Romania (d. 1923)
- May 7 – Karl Mauch, German explorer (d. 1875)
- May 9
  - Adam Opel, German engineer, industrialist (d. 1895)
  - Ben Hall, Australian bushranger (d. 1865)
- May 27 – Wild Bill Hickok, American gunfighter (d. 1876)
- May 28
  - George Ashlin, Irish architect (d. 1921)
  - Tony Pastor, American impresario, theater owner (d. 1908)
- June 22
  - Paul Bachmann, German mathematician (d. 1920)
  - Paul Morphy, American chess player (d. 1884)
  - Touch the Clouds, Native American Miniconjou chief (d. 1905)
- June 28 – Petre P. Carp, 2-time prime minister of Romania (d. 1919)

=== July–September ===
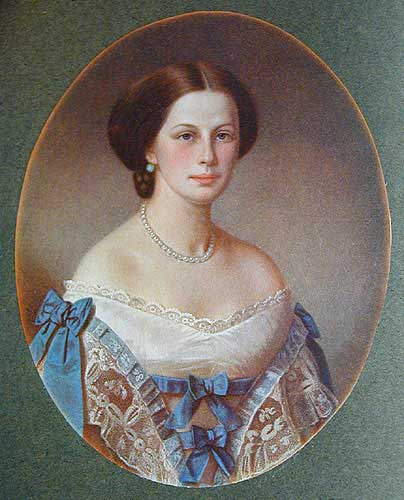
Anna Filosofova

- July 4 – Carolus-Duran, French painter (d. 1917)
- July 15 – Stephanie of Hohenzollern-Sigmaringen, Queen consort of Portugal (d. 1859)
- July 18 – Vasil Levski, Bulgarian revolutionary (d. 1873)
- July 21 – Johanna Hedén, Swedish midwife, surgeon (d. 1912)
- August 1 – (bapt.) Mary Harris Jones ("Mother Jones"), Irish-American labor leader (d. 1930)
- August 5 – Anna Filosofova, Russian women's rights activist (d. 1912)
- August 11 – John Ward, English palaeontologist (d. 1906)
- August 24 – Théodore Dubois, French composer (d. 1924)
- September 2 – James H. Wilson, Union Army major general in the American Civil War (d. 1925)
- September 12 – Louis IV, Grand Duke of Hesse (d. 1892)
- September 14 – Nikolai Bugaev, Russian mathematician (d.1903)
- September 16 – King Pedro V of Portugal (d. 1861)
- September 18 – Aires de Ornelas e Vasconcelos, Portuguese Archbishop of Goa (d. 1880)
- September 24 – Mark Hanna, United States Senator from Ohio (d. 1904)

=== October–December ===
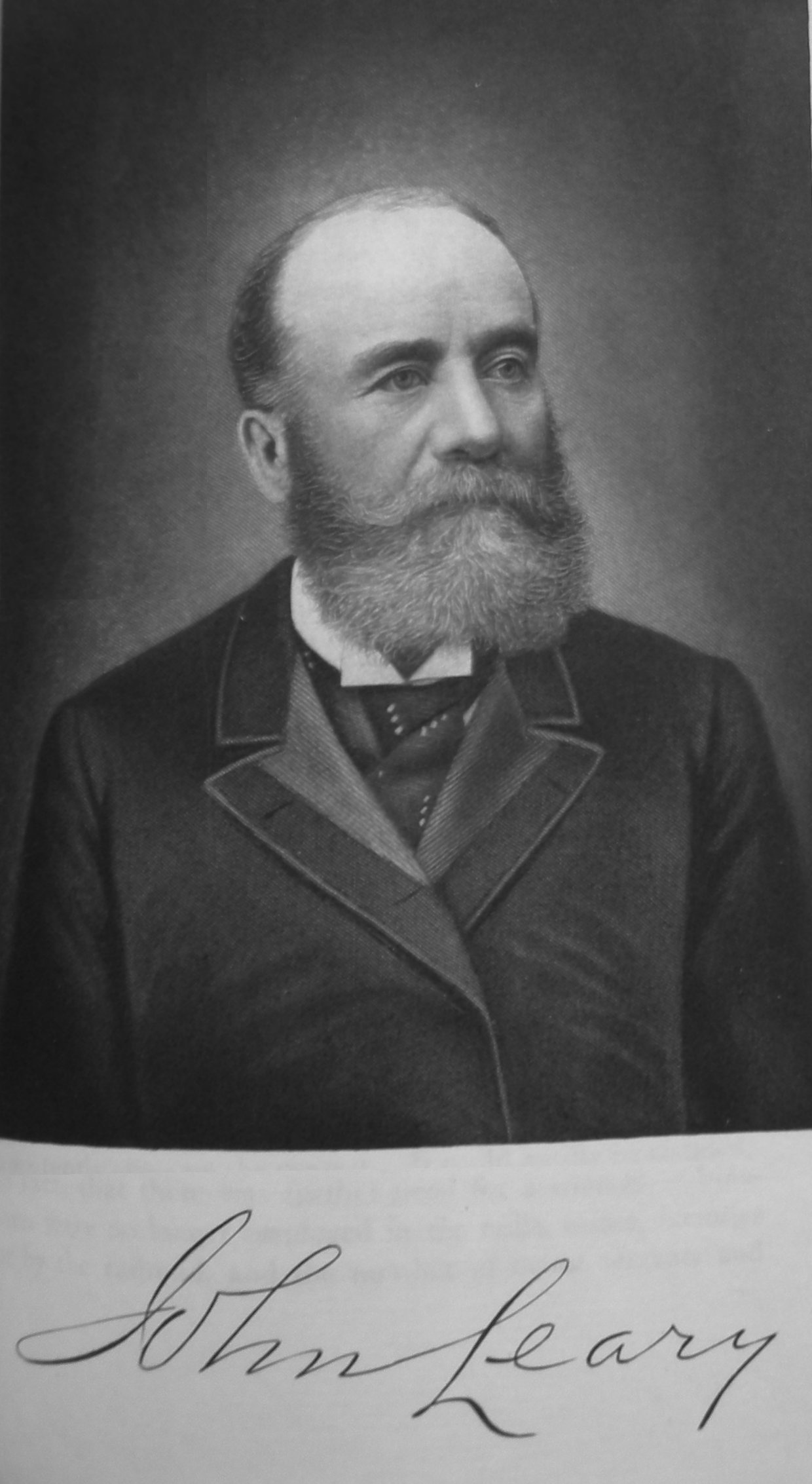
John Leary

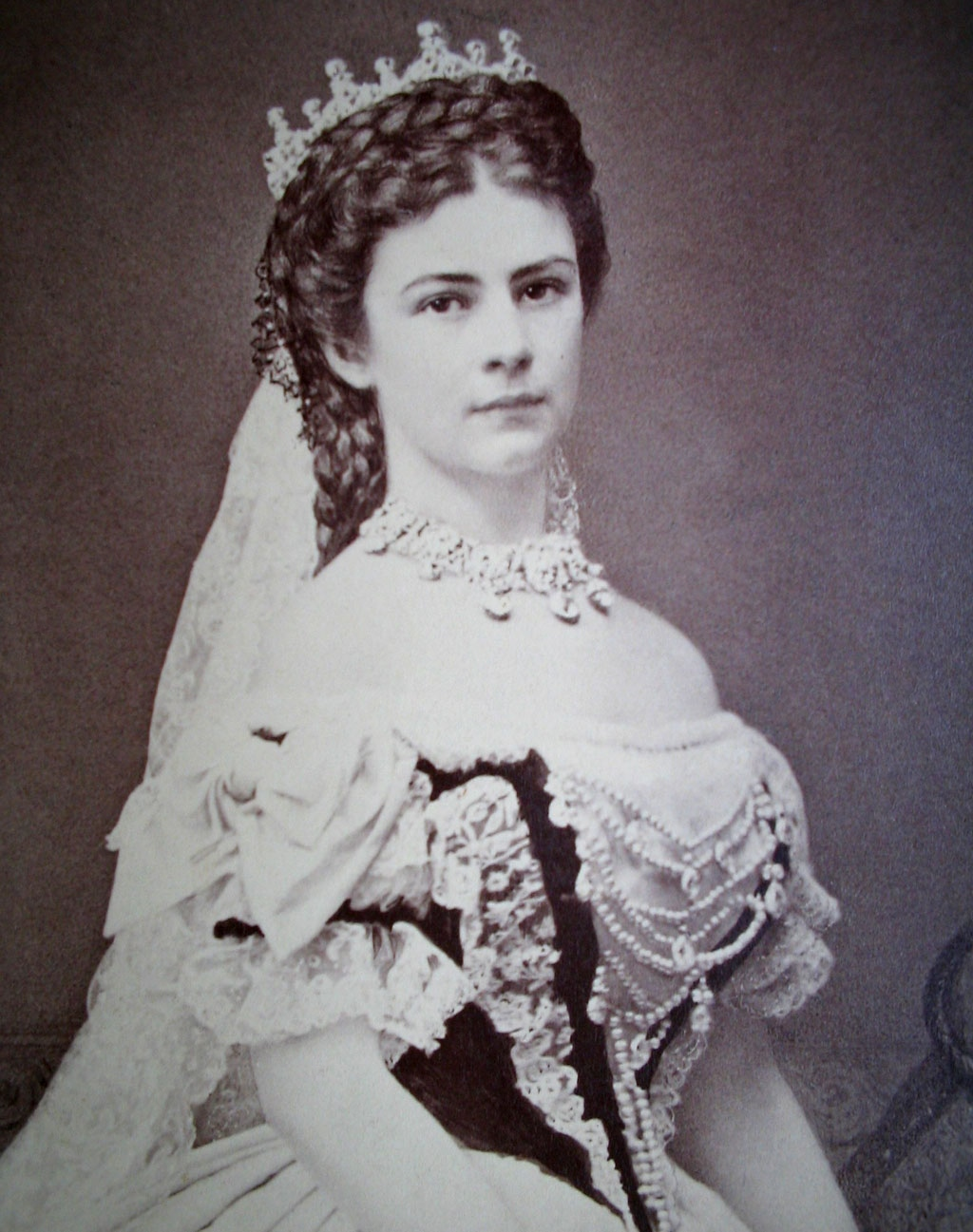
Empress Elisabeth of Austria

- October 3 – Nicolás Avellaneda, Argentine president (d. 1885)
- October 4 – Auguste-Réal Angers, Canadian judge and politician, 6th Lieutenant Governor of Quebec (d. 1919)
- October 5 – José Plácido Caamaño, 12th President of Ecuador (d. 1900)
- October 10 – Robert Gould Shaw, Union Army general in the American Civil War, social reformer (k. 1863)
- October 26 – Carl Koldewey, German explorer famous for the German North Polar Expedition (d. 1908)
- October 28 – Tokugawa Yoshinobu, Japanese shōgun, 15th and last of the Tokugawa shogunate (d. 1913)
- October 29 – Harriet Powers, African-American folk artist (d. 1910)
- November 1 – John Leary, American businessman, politician, and civic leader (d. 1905)
- November 2 – Émile Bayard, French artist, illustrator (d. 1891)
- November 5 – Arnold Janssen, German-born Catholic priest, saint (d. 1909)
- November 20 – Lewis Waterman, American inventor, businessman (d.1901)
- November 23 – Johannes Diderik van der Waals, Dutch physicist, Nobel Prize laureate (d. 1923)
- December (unknown date) – Bella French Swisher, American writer (d. 1893)
- December 9 – Kabayama Sukenori, Japanese samurai, general, and statesman (d. 1922)
- December 11 – Webster Paulson, English civil engineer (d. 1887)
- December 15 – George B. Post, American architect (d. 1913)
- December 24
  - Empress Elisabeth of Austria, wife of Emperor Franz Joseph I (d. 1898)
  - Cosima Wagner, wife of German composer Richard Wagner (d. 1930)
- December 26
  - Sir William Dawkins, British geologist (d. 1929)
  - George Dewey, American admiral (d. 1917)

1838

=== January–March ===
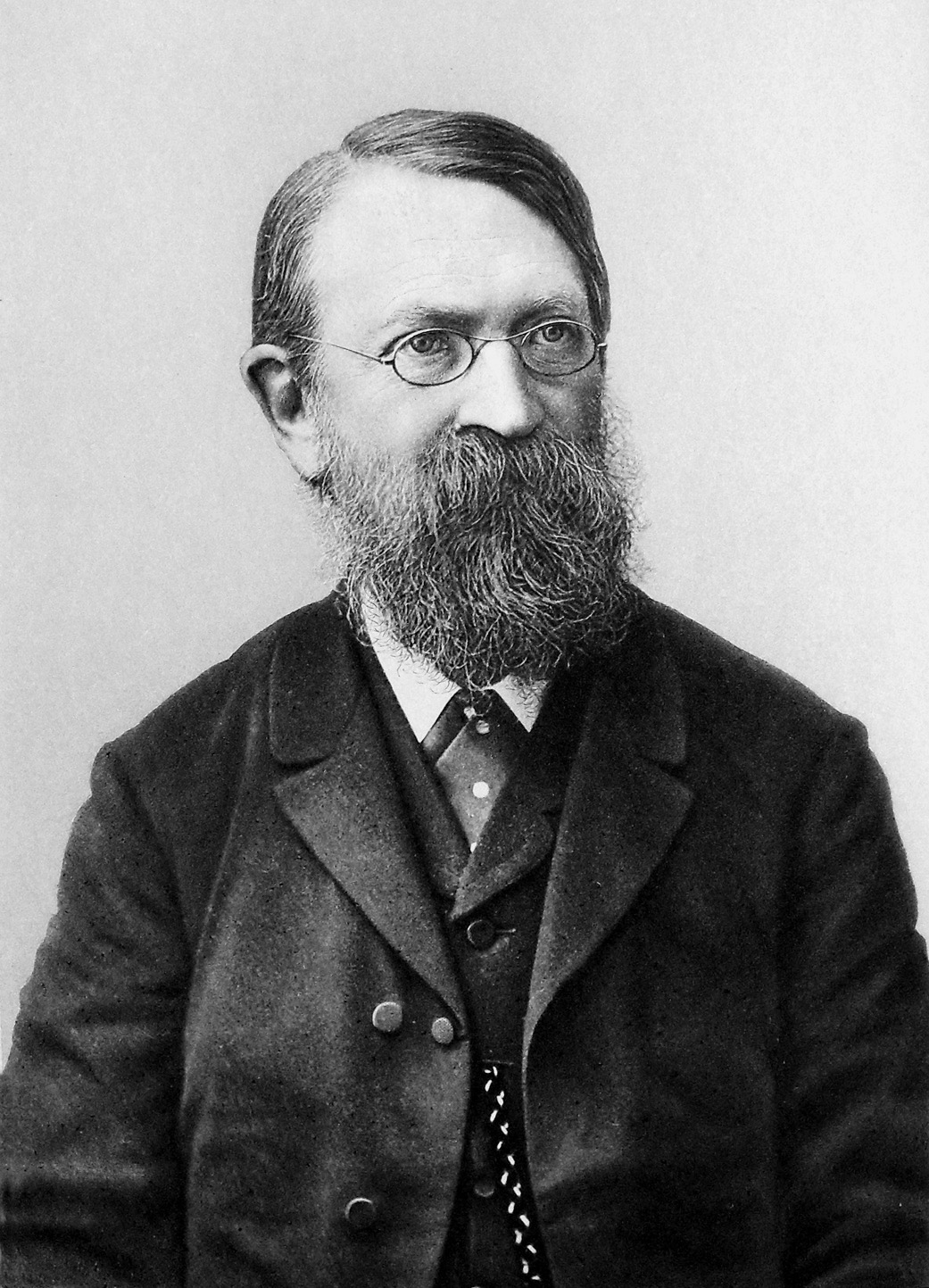
Ernst Mach

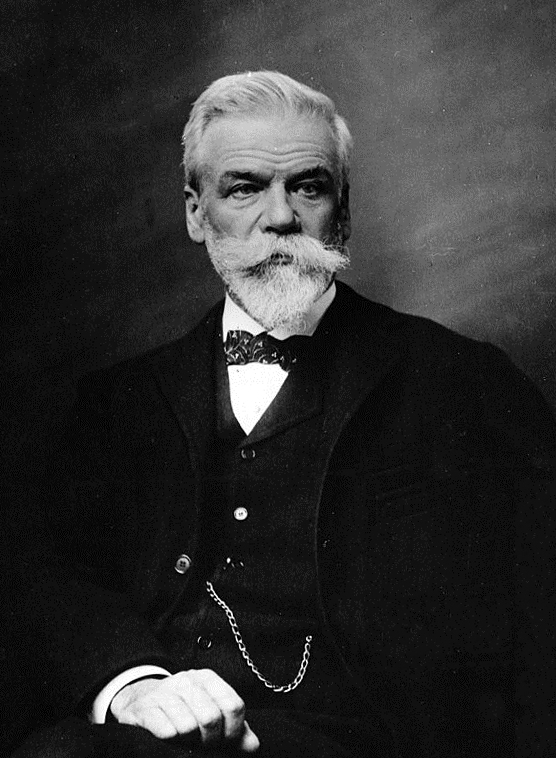
Ernest Solvay

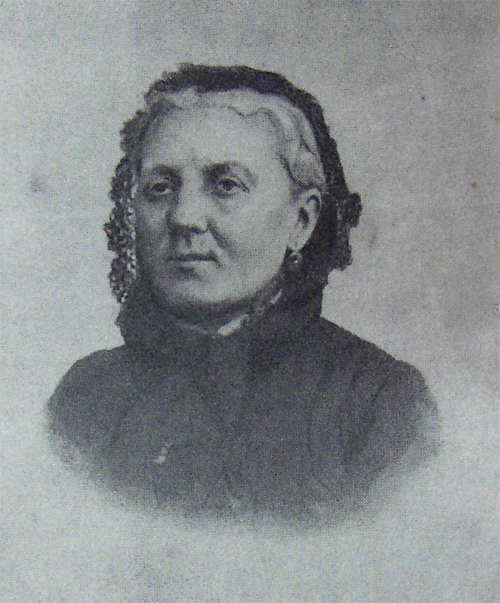
Isabelle Bogelot

- January 4 – General Tom Thumb, American circus performer, entertainer (d. 1883)
- January 6
  - Anton Berindei, Wallachian-born Romanian general and politician (d. 1899)
  - Max Bruch, German composer (d. 1920)
- January 16 – Franz Brentano, German philosopher, psychologist (d. 1917)
- January 29 – Edward W. Morley, American chemist noted for working on the Michelson–Morley experiment (d. 1923)
- February 2 – John Joseph Jolly Kyle, Scots-born Argentine chemist (d. 1922)
- February 6 – Sir Henry Irving, English actor (d. 1905)
- February 9 – Sir Evelyn Wood, British field marshal, Victoria Cross recipient (d. 1919)
- February 12 – Julius Dresser, American writer (d. 1893)
- February 13 – Annetta Seabury Dresser, American writer (d. 1893)
- February 16 – Henry Brooks Adams, American historian (d. 1918)
- February 18 – Ernst Mach, Austrian physicist, philosopher (d. 1916)
- March 3 – George William Hill, American astronomer (d. 1914)
- March 11 – Ōkuma Shigenobu, Japanese politician (d. 1922)
- March 12 – Sir William Perkin, English chemist (d. 1907)
- March 15 – Alice Cunningham Fletcher, American ethnologist, anthropologist, and social scientist (d. 1923)

=== April–June ===
- April 2 – Léon Gambetta, 37th Prime Minister of France (d. 1882)
- April 3 – John Willis Menard, African-American politician (d. 1893)
- April 12 – John Shaw Billings, American military and medical leader (d. 1913)
- April 16
  - Ernest Solvay, Belgian chemist, industrialist and philanthropist (d. 1922)
  - Martha McClellan Brown, American temperance movement leader (d. 1916)
- April 18 – Paul-Émile Lecoq de Boisbaudran, French chemist (d. 1912)
- April 21 – John Muir, American ecologist (d. 1914)
- April 28 – Tobias Asser, Dutch jurist, recipient of the Nobel Peace Prize (d. 1913)
- May 10 – John Wilkes Booth, American actor, assassin of Abraham Lincoln (d. 1865)
- May 11 – Isabelle Bogelot, French philanthropist (d. 1923)
- May 20 – Jules Méline, French statesman (d. 1925)
- June 14 – Yamagata Aritomo, Japanese field marshal, Prime Minister (d. 1922)
- June 19 – Mary Cole Walling, American patriot, lecturer (d. 1925)
- June 24 – Gustav von Schmoller, German economist (d. 1917)
- June 27 – Bankim Chandra Chatterjee, Indian author (d. 1894)

=== July–September ===
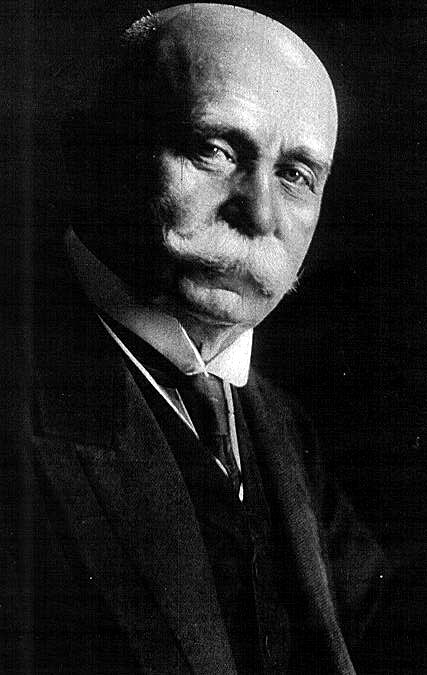
Ferdinand von Zeppelin

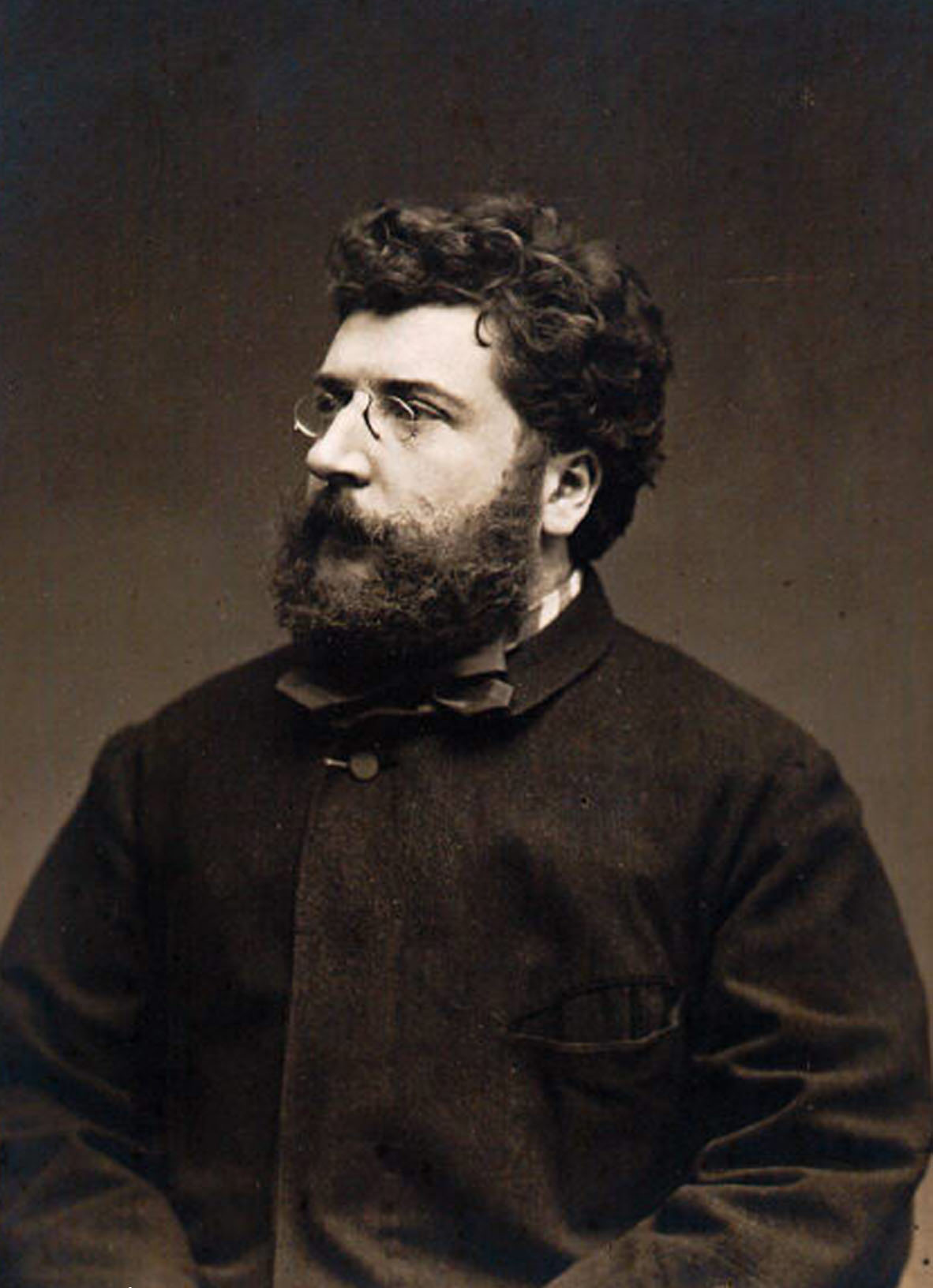
Georges Bizet

- July full date unknown – Bass Reeves, one of the first black Deputy U.S. Marshals west of the Mississippi River (d. 1910)
- July 1 – Marie-Louise Jaÿ, French businesswoman (d. 1925)
- July 5 – Vatroslav Jagić, Croatian scholar (d. 1923)
- July 7 – Felice Napoleone Canevaro, Italian admiral (d. 1926)
- July 8 – Ferdinand von Zeppelin, German military officer, founder of the Zeppelin Company (d. 1917)
- July 11 – John Wanamaker, American merchant and religious, civic and political figure (d. 1922)
- July 20 – Sir George Trevelyan, 2nd Baronet, British statesman, author (d. 1928)
- September 2
  - Bhaktivinoda Thakur, Indian guru, philosopher (d. 1914)
  - Liliuokalani, last Queen of Hawaii (d. 1917)
- September 17 – Valeriano Weyler, Spanish general (d. 1930)
- September 21
  - Constantin Budișteanu (birth also reported as November 4), Wallachian-born Romanian soldier and politician (d. 1911)
  - Victoria Woodhull, American woman's suffrage leader; first woman to run for U.S. President (d. 1927)
- September 27 – Lawrence Sullivan Ross, Confederate brigadier general, Texas governor and president of Texas A&M University (d. 1898)
- September 28 – Sai Baba, Indian spiritual master and National saint (d. 1918)
- September 29 – Henry Hobson Richardson, American architect (d. 1886)
- September 30 – Phoebe Jane Babcock Wait, American physician (d. 1904)

=== October–December ===
- October 6 – Giuseppe Cesare Abba, Italian patriot, writer (d. 1910)
- October 8 – John Hay, diplomat, private secretary to Abraham Lincoln, 37th United States Secretary of State (d. 1905)
- October 25 – Georges Bizet, French composer (d. 1875)
- October 31 – King Luís I of Portugal (d. 1889)
- November 1 – Khedrup Gyatso, 11th Dalai Lama (d. 1856)
- November 4 – Constantin Budișteanu (birth also reported as September 21), Wallachian-born Romanian soldier and politician (d. 1911)
- November 7 – Auguste Villiers de l'Isle-Adam, French writer (d. 1889)
- November 8 – Rufus W. Peckham, Associate Justice of the Supreme Court of the United States (d. 1909)
- November 13 – Joseph F. Smith, 6th president of the Church of Jesus Christ of Latter-day Saints (d. 1918)
- November 17 – Sir Lambton Loraine, 11th Baronet, British naval officer (d. 1917)
- November 20 – Hedvig Raa-Winterhjelm, pioneer Scandinavian actor (d. 1907)
- November 23 – Stephanos Skouloudis, 34th Prime Minister of Greece (d. 1928)
- November 29 – Giovanni Losi, Italian Combonian missionary (d. 1882)
- December 3 – Cleveland Abbe, American meteorologist (d. 1916)
- December 3 – Octavia Hill, British social reformer (d. 1912)
- December 19 – Darinka Petrovic, Princess consort of Montenegro (d. 1892)
- December 20 – Edwin Abbott Abbott, English theologian, author (d. 1926)
- December 30 – Émile Loubet, 8th President of France (d. 1929)

=== Date unknown ===
- Jamāl al-Dīn al-Afghānī, Islamic teacher, writer (d. 1897)
- Bass Reeves, American lawman and first black deputy U.S. marshall (d. 1910)

1839

=== January–June ===
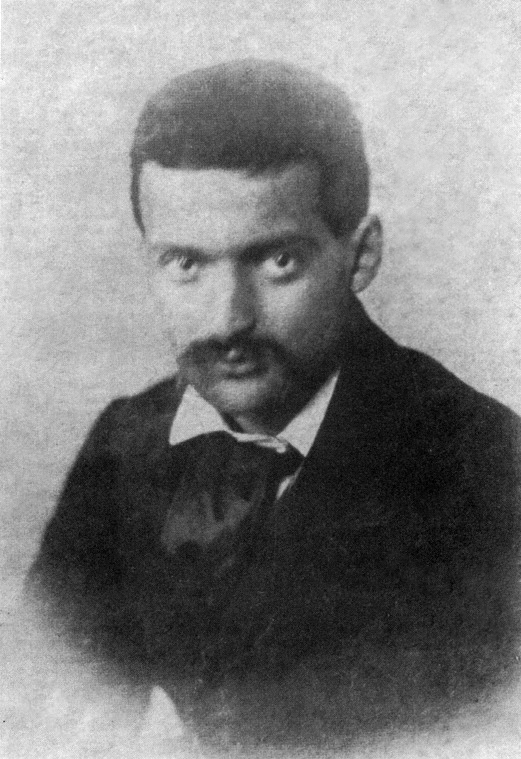
Paul Cézanne

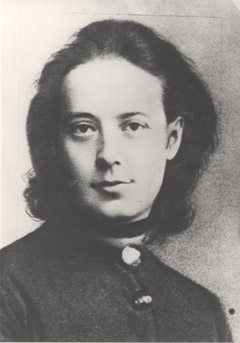
Marianne Hainisch

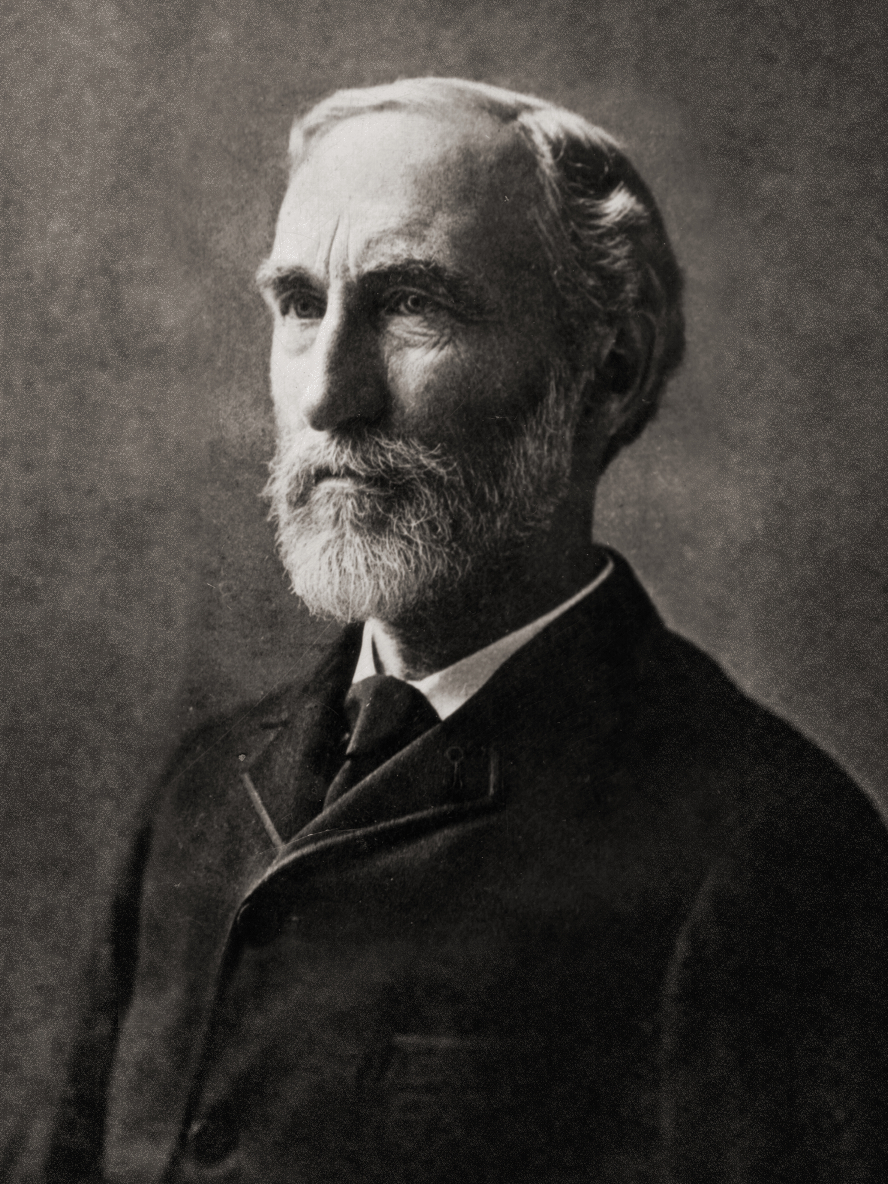
Josiah Willard Gibbs

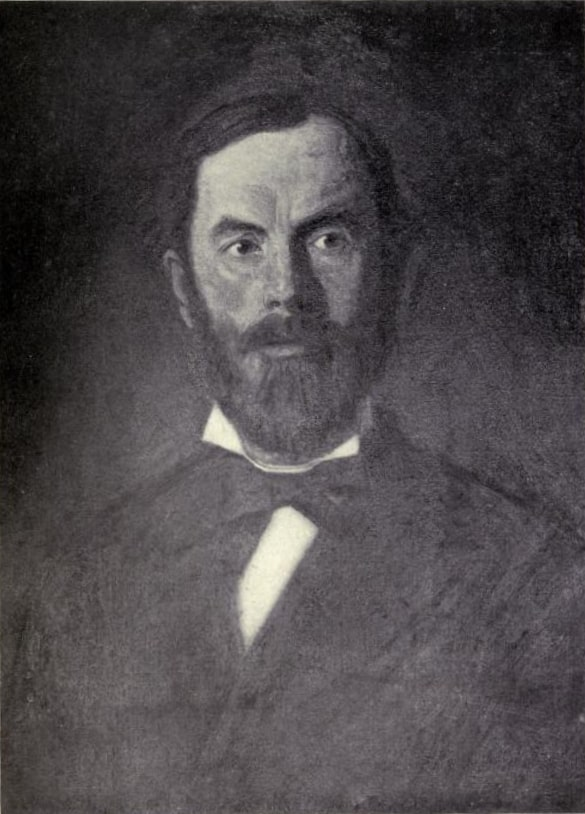
Frederic W. Tilton

- January 2 – Gustave Trouvé, French electrical engineer, inventor (d. 1902)
- January 8 – William A. Clark, American politician, entrepreneur (d. 1925)
- January 9 – John Knowles Paine, American composer (d. 1906)
- January 19 – Paul Cézanne, French painter (d. 1906)
- January 26 – Rachel Lloyd, American chemist (d. 1900)
- February 6 – Caroline Testman, Danish women's rights activist (d. 1919)
- February 11
  - Josiah Willard Gibbs, American physicist, chemist (d. 1903)
  - Almon Brown Strowger, American telecommunications engineer (d. 1902)
- February 15 – Rayko Zhinzifov, Bulgarian poet and translator (d. 1877)
- February 18 – Pascual Cervera y Topete, Spanish admiral (d. 1909)
- February 22 – Francis Pharcellus Church, American editor, publisher (d. 1906)
- March 3 – Jamsetji Tata, Indian Parsi businessman (d. 1904)
- March 8 – Josephine Cochrane, American inventor of the first commercially successful dishwasher (d. 1913)
- March 15 – Daniel Ridgway Knight, American artist (d. 1924)
- March 16
  - Sully Prudhomme, French poet, critic, Nobel Prize laureate (d. 1907)
  - John Butler Yeats, Irish artist (d. 1922)
- March 21 – Modest Mussorgsky, Russian composer (d. 1881)
- March 23 – Julius von Hann, Austrian meteorologist (The father of modern meteorology) (d. 1921)
- March 25
  - Carlo Pellegrini, Italian caricaturist (d. 1889)
  - Marianne Hainisch, founder, leader of the Austrian women's movement (d. 1936)
- March 27 – John Ballance, 14th Premier of New Zealand (d. 1893)
- April 3 – Karl, Freiherr von Prel, German philosopher (d. 1899)
- April 8 – Belle L. Pettigrew, American teacher, missionary (d. 1912)
- April 12 – Nikolay Przhevalsky, Russian explorer (d. 1888)
- April 16 – Antonio Starabba, Marchese di Rudinì, 12th Prime Minister of Italy (d. 1908)
- April 23 – Tom Allen, English boxer (d. 1903)
- April 30
  - Floriano Peixoto, 2nd President of Brazil (d. 1895)
  - Yoshitoshi, Japanese artist (d. 1892)
- May 21 – Mary of the Passion, French Roman Catholic religious sister, missionary, and blessed (d. 1904)
- June 1 – Abdyl Frashëri, Albanian politician (d.1892)
- June 10 – Ludvig Holstein-Ledreborg, Prime Minister of Denmark (d. 1912)
- June 17 – Arthur Tooth, Anglican clergyman prosecuted for Ritualist practices in the 1870s (d. 1931)
- June 21 – Machado de Assis, Brazilian author (d. 1908)

=== July–December ===
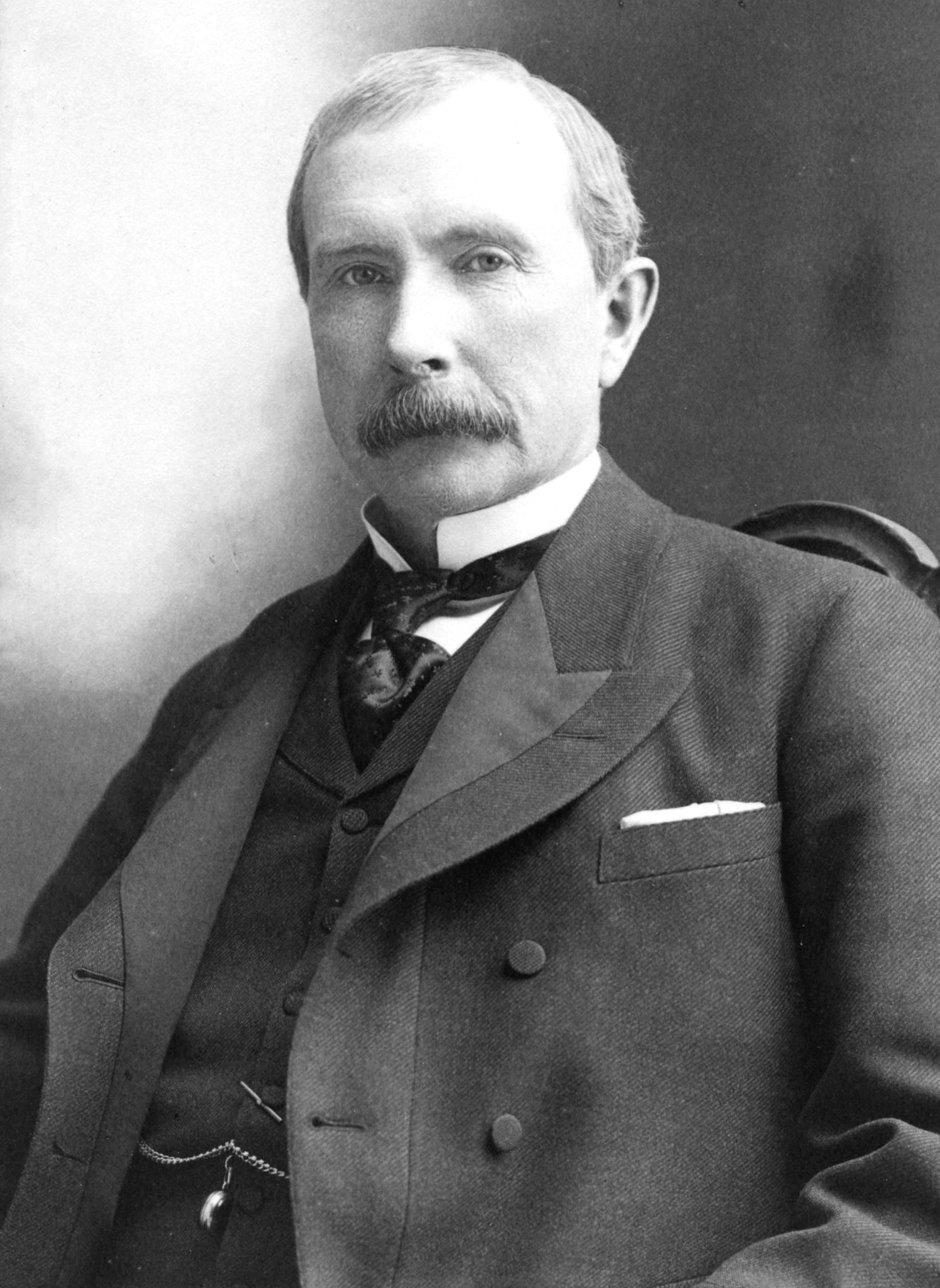
John D. Rockefeller

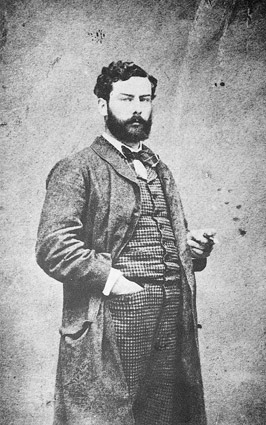
Alfred Sisley

- July – Baba Jaimal Singh, Founder of Radha Soami Satsang Beas (d. 1903)
- July 6 – Édouard Pottier, French admiral (d. 1903)
- July 8 – John D. Rockefeller, American industrialist, philanthropist (d. 1937)
- July 17 – Ephraim Shay, American inventor of the Shay locomotive (d. 1916)
- July 18 – James Surtees Phillpotts, English author (d. 1930)
- July 22 – Jacob Hägg, Swedish admiral and painter (d. 1931)
- July 28 – Isabelle Gatti de Gamond, Italo-Belgian educationalist, feminist, and politician (d. 1905)
- July 31 – Ignacio Andrade, 37th President of Venezuela (d. 1925)
- August 4 – Walter Pater, English essayist, critic (d. 1894)
- August 8 – Nelson A. Miles, American general (d. 1925)
- August 15 – Antonín Petrof, Czech piano maker (d. 1915)
- September 2 – Henry George, American writer, politician, and political economist (d. 1897)
- September 7 – Patricio Montojo y Pasarón, Spanish admiral (d. 1917)
- September 8 – Gregorio Luperón, Dominican soldier, activist and general (d. 1897)
- September 9 – Maria Swanenburg, Dutch serial killer (d. 1915)
- September 10 – Charles Sanders Peirce, American philosopher, logician, mathematician, and scientist (d. 1914)
- September 12 – Mary H. Graves, American minister, literary editor, writer (d. 1908)
- October 2 – Oscar de Négrier, French general (d. 1913)
- October 9
  - Georges Leclanché, French electrical engineer, inventor (d. 1882)
  - Winfield Scott Schley, American admiral (d. 1911)
- October 11 – Jeanne Merkus, Dutch deaconess, guerilla soldier, and political activist (d. 1897)
- October 30 – Alfred Sisley, French Impressionist landscape painter (d. 1899)
- November 1 – Pál Luthár, Slovene writer in Hungary (d. 1919)
- November 1 – Ahmed Muhtar Pasha, Ottoman field marshal (d. 1919)
- November 12 – Frank Furness, American architect, soldier (d. 1912)
- November 18 – Emil Škoda, Czech engineer, industrialist (d. 1900)
- November 20 – Christian Wilberg, German painter (d. 1882)
- November 30 – Catherine Amanda Coburn, American journalist, newspaper editor (d. 1913)
- December 5 – George Armstrong Custer, American cavalry officer (d. 1876)
- December 7 – Sir Redvers Buller, British general, Victoria Cross recipient (d. 1908)
- December 21 – Sherman Conant, American soldier and politician (d. 1890)

=== Date unknown ===
- Avis Crocombe, English cook at Audley End House

== Deaths ==
1830

=== January–June ===
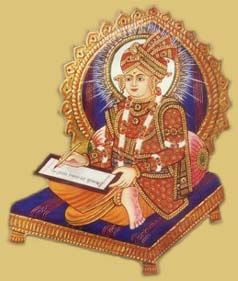
Swaminarayan

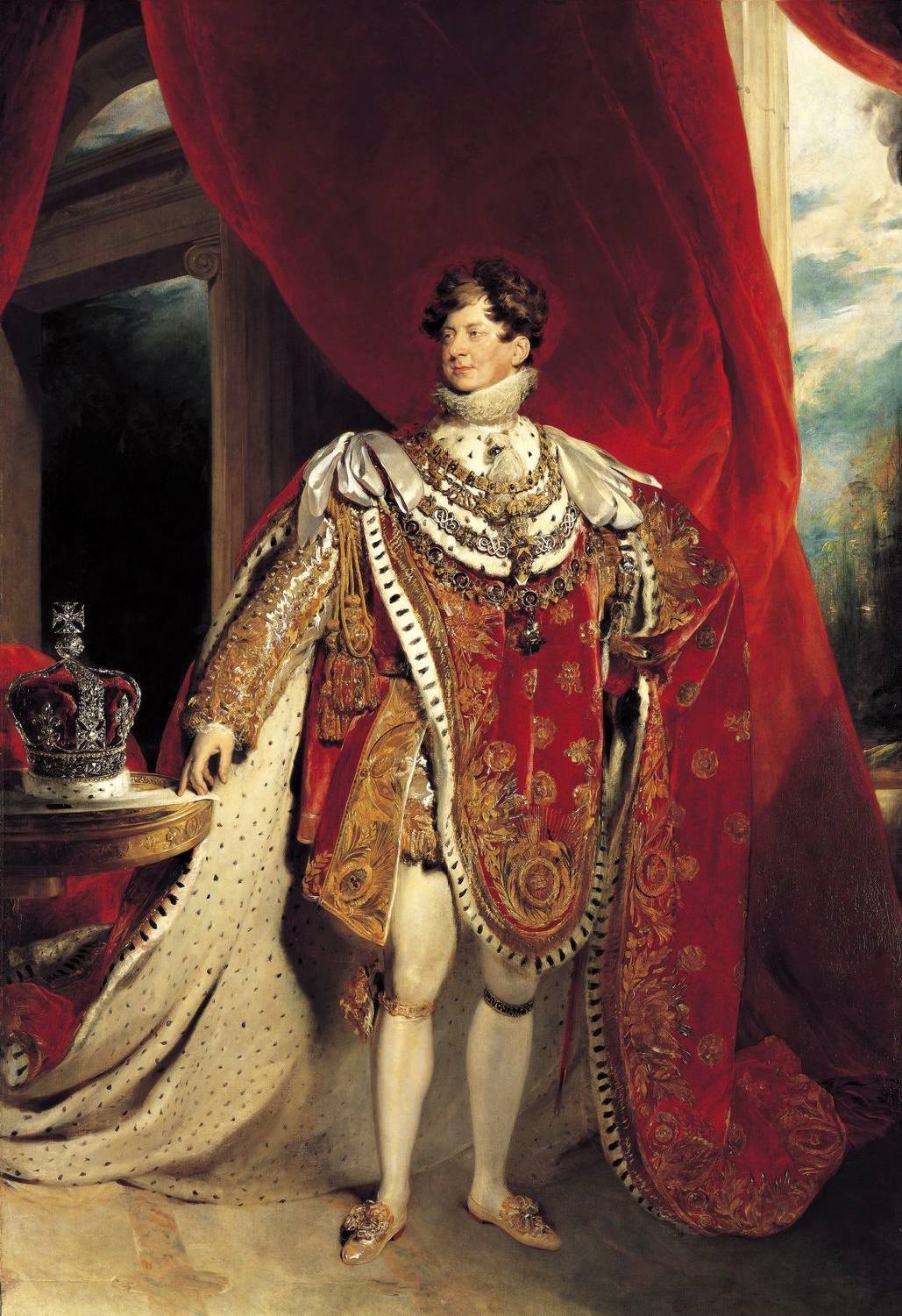
George IV

- January 7
  - Thomas Lawrence, English painter (b. 1769)
  - John Campbell, Australian public servant and politician (b. 1770)
  - Carlota Joaquina of Spain, Queen consort of Portugal (b. 1775)
- January 19 – Johann Schweighäuser, German classical scholar (b. 1742)
- January 25 – Benito de Soto, Galician pirate, executed (b. 1805)
- January 26 – Filippo Castagna, Maltese politician (b. 1765)
- February 2 – Manoel da Costa Ataíde, Brazilian painter (b. 1762)
- February 22 – William Badger, master shipbuilder (b. 1752)
- February 23 – Jean-Pierre Norblin de La Gourdaine (Jan Piotr Norblin), French-born Polish painter (b. 1740)
- March 2 – Samuel Thomas von Sömmerring, German physician, anatomist (b. 1755)
- March 7 – Jacques Villeré, first Creole governor of Louisiana (b. 1761)
- March 16 – Sir Robert Farquhar, British merchant, colonial governor and politician (b. 1776)
- March 17 – Laurent de Gouvion Saint-Cyr, French marshal (b. 1764)
- April 14 – Erike Kirstine Kolstad, Norwegian actress (b. 1792)
- June 1 – Swaminarayan (Sahajanand Swami), Indian yogi, central figure in Swaminarayan Hinduism (b. 1781)
- June 4 – Antonio José de Sucre, Venezuelan revolutionary leader, statesman (b. 1795)
- June 26 – King George IV of the United Kingdom (b. 1762)

=== July–December ===
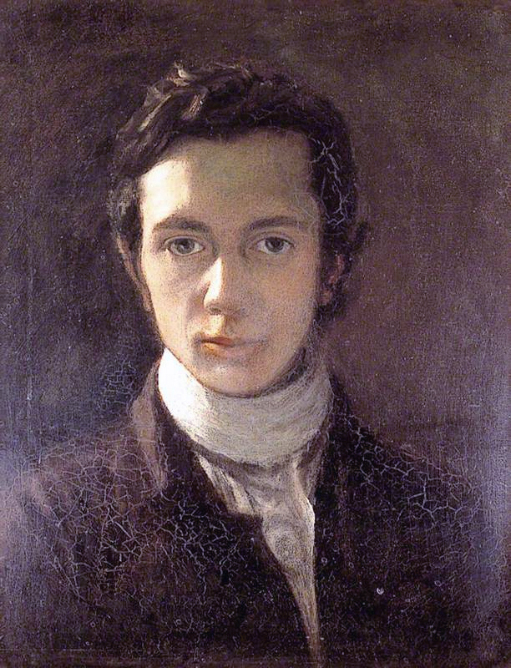
William Hazlitt

- August 6 – David Walker, African-American abolitionist (b. 1796)
- August 24 – Louis Pierre Vieillot, French ornithologist (b. 1748)
- September 18 – William Hazlitt, English essayist (b. 1778)
- September 23
  - Alice Flowerdew, British teacher, poet, and hymnwriter, (b. 1759)
  - Elizabeth Monroe, First Lady of the United States (b. 1768)
- October 4 – Ludwig Yorck von Wartenburg, Prussian military leader (b. 1759)
- October 5 – Dinicu Golescu, Romanian writer (b. 1777)
- October 11 – José de La Mar, military leader, President of Peru (b. 1776)
- October 31 – Petar I Petrović-Njegoš, ruler of Montenegro (b. 1747)
- November 8 – Francis I of the Two Sicilies (b. 1777)
- November 18 – Adam Weishaupt, German philosopher (b. 1748)
- November 30 – Pope Pius VIII, Italian pontiff (b. 1761)
- December 6 – Morton Eden, 1st Baron Henley, British diplomat (b. 1752)
- December 8 – Benjamin Constant, Swiss writer (b. 1767)
- December 17 – Simón Bolívar, Venezuelan revolutionary leader, statesman (b. 1783)

=== Date unknown ===
- Temerl Bergson, Polish Jewish businesswoman, philanthropist
- Clelia Durazzo Grimaldi, Italian botanist (b. 1760)

1831

=== January–June ===
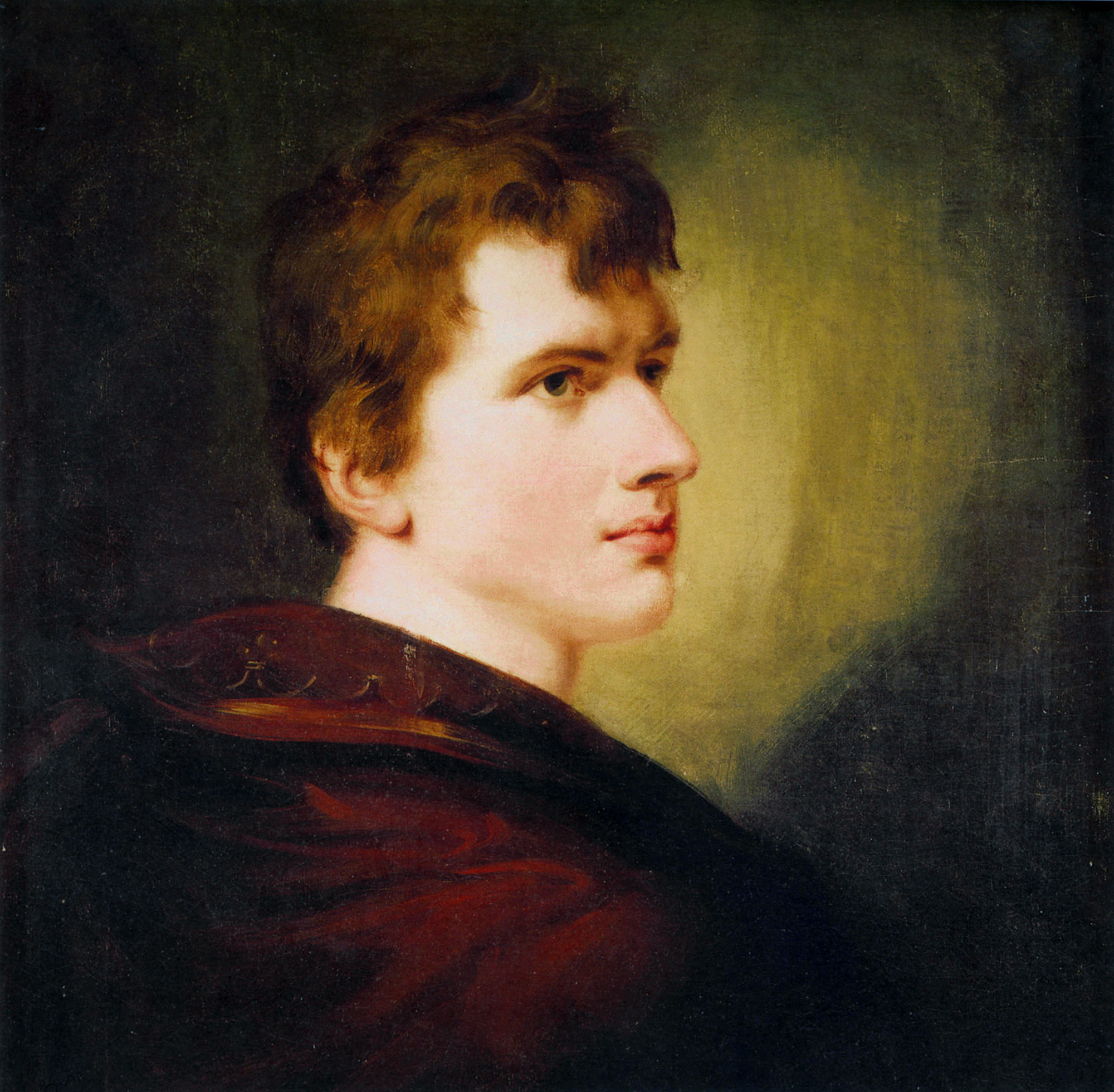
Ludwig Achim von Arnim

- January 8 – Franz Krommer, Czech composer (b. 1759)
- January 21 – Ludwig Achim von Arnim, German poet (b. 1781)
- February 2 – Vincenzo Dimech, Maltese sculptor (b. 1768)
- February 14
  - Vicente Guerrero, 2nd President of Mexico, Independence War hero (b. 1782)
  - Marye of Yejju, Ethiopian Ras
  - Sabagadis, Ethiopian warlord (b. c. 1770)
- February 17 – Friedrich Wilhelm, Duke of Schleswig-Holstein-Sonderburg-Glücksburg (b. 1785)
- March 9 – Friedrich Maximilian Klinger, German writer (b. 1752)
- April 5 – Dmitry Senyavin, Russian admiral (b. 1763)
- April 20 – John Abernethy, English surgeon (b. 1764)
- April 21 – Thursday October Christian I, Pitcairn Islander and son of Fletcher Christian (b. 1790)
- April 27 – Charles Felix of Sardinia, King of Sardinia (b. 1765)
- April 30 – Collet Barker, British military officer, explorer (b. 1784)
- May 17 – Nathaniel Rochester, American politician (b. 1752)
- June 5 – Tarenorerer, indigenous Australian Tasman freedom fighter (b. 1800)

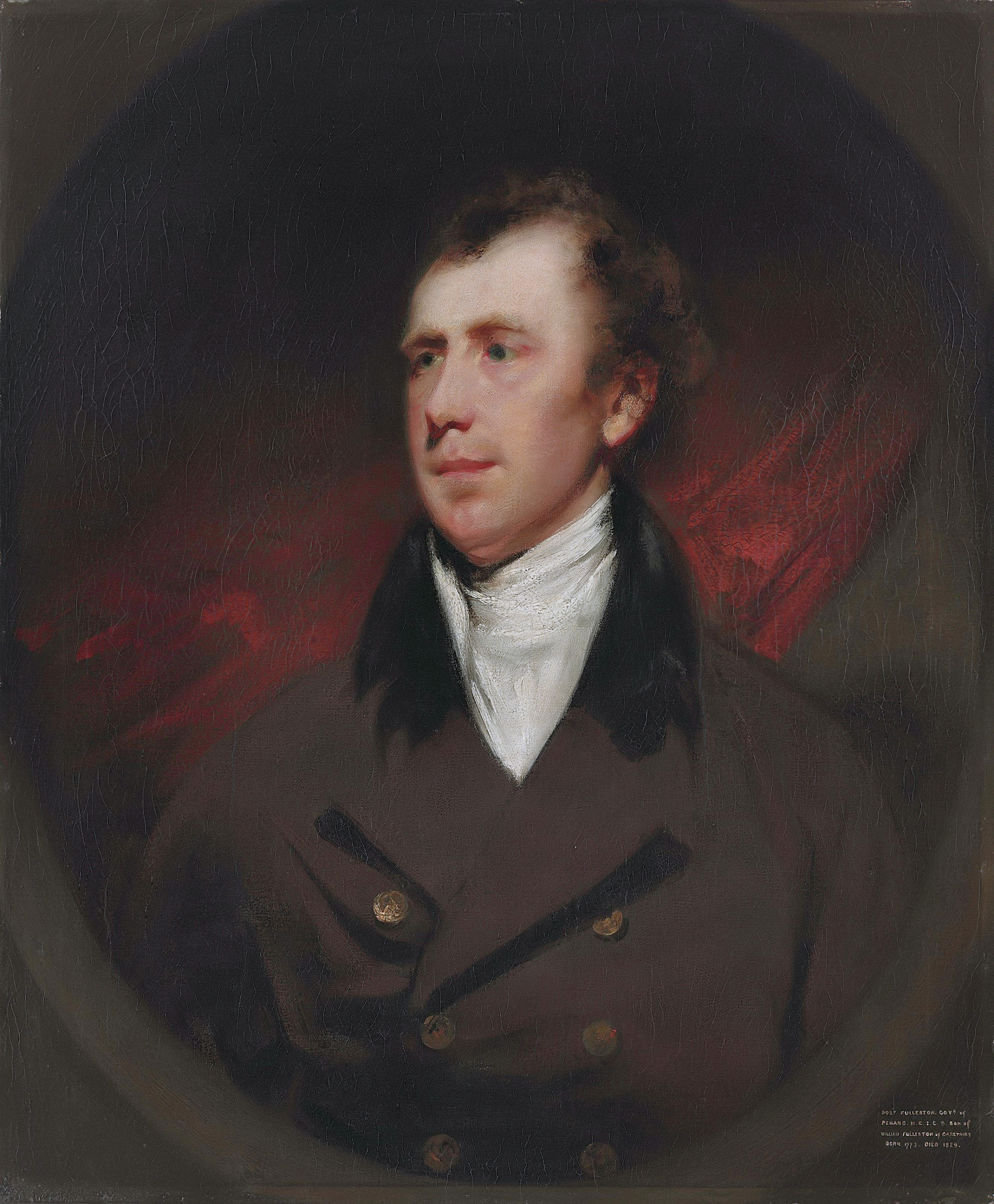
Robert Fullerton

- June 6 – Robert Fullerton, governor of Penang, first governor of British Straits Settlements (b. 1773)
- June 8 – Sarah Siddons, English actress (b. 1755)
- June 27 – Sophie Germain, French mathematician (b. 1776)
- June 30 – William Roscoe, English abolitionist and writer (b. 1753)

=== July–December ===
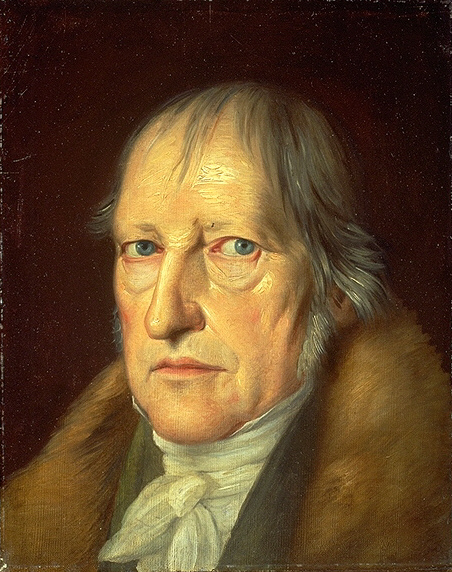
Georg Hegel

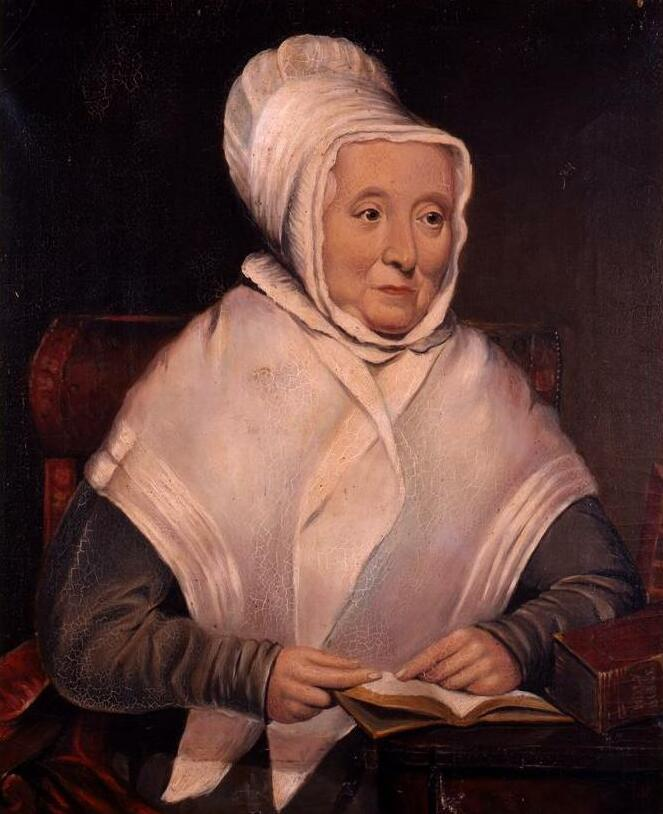
Hannah Adams

- July 4 – James Monroe, 73, 5th President of the United States (b. 1758)
- July 16 – Louis Alexandre Andrault de Langeron, Russian general (b. 1763)
- July 20 – Jacques Defermon des Chapelières, French politician (b. 1752)
- August 5 – Sébastien Érard, German-born French instrument maker (b. 1752)
- August 24 – August von Gneisenau, Prussian field marshal (b. 1760)
- September 28 – Philippine Engelhard, German writer, scholar (b. 1756)
- November 6 – Hilchen Sommerschild, Norwegian educator (b. 1756)
- November 11 – Nat Turner, American slave rebel (b. 1800)
- November 14 – Georg Hegel, German philosopher (b. 1770)
- November 16 – Carl von Clausewitz, German military strategist (b. 1780)
- November 19 – Titumir, Bengali revolutionary (b. 1782)
- November 21 – Marie Anne Simonis, Belgian textile industrialist (b. 1758)
- December 15 – Hannah Adams, American author (b. 1755)
- December 18 – Willem Bilderdijk, Dutch author (b. 1756)
- December 23 – Emilia Plater, Polish heroine (b. 1806)
- December 26
  - Henry Louis Vivian Derozio, Indian poet (b. 1809)
  - Stephen Girard, French-American banker (b. 1750)

=== Date unknown ===
- Marengo, Napoleon's mount in several battles (b. 1793)
- Charlotta Richardy, Swedish industrialist (b. 1751)

1832

=== January–June ===
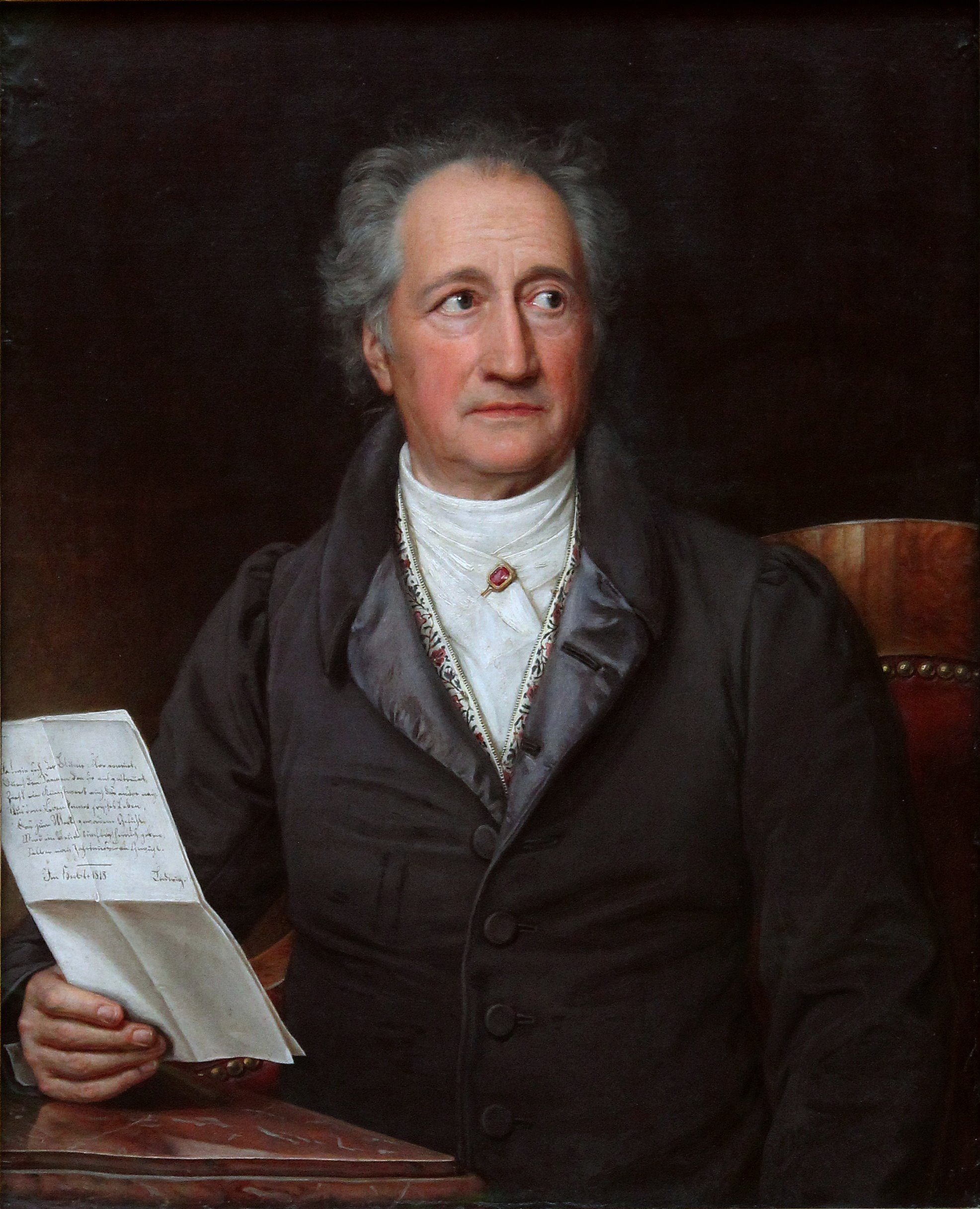
Johann Wolfgang von Goethe

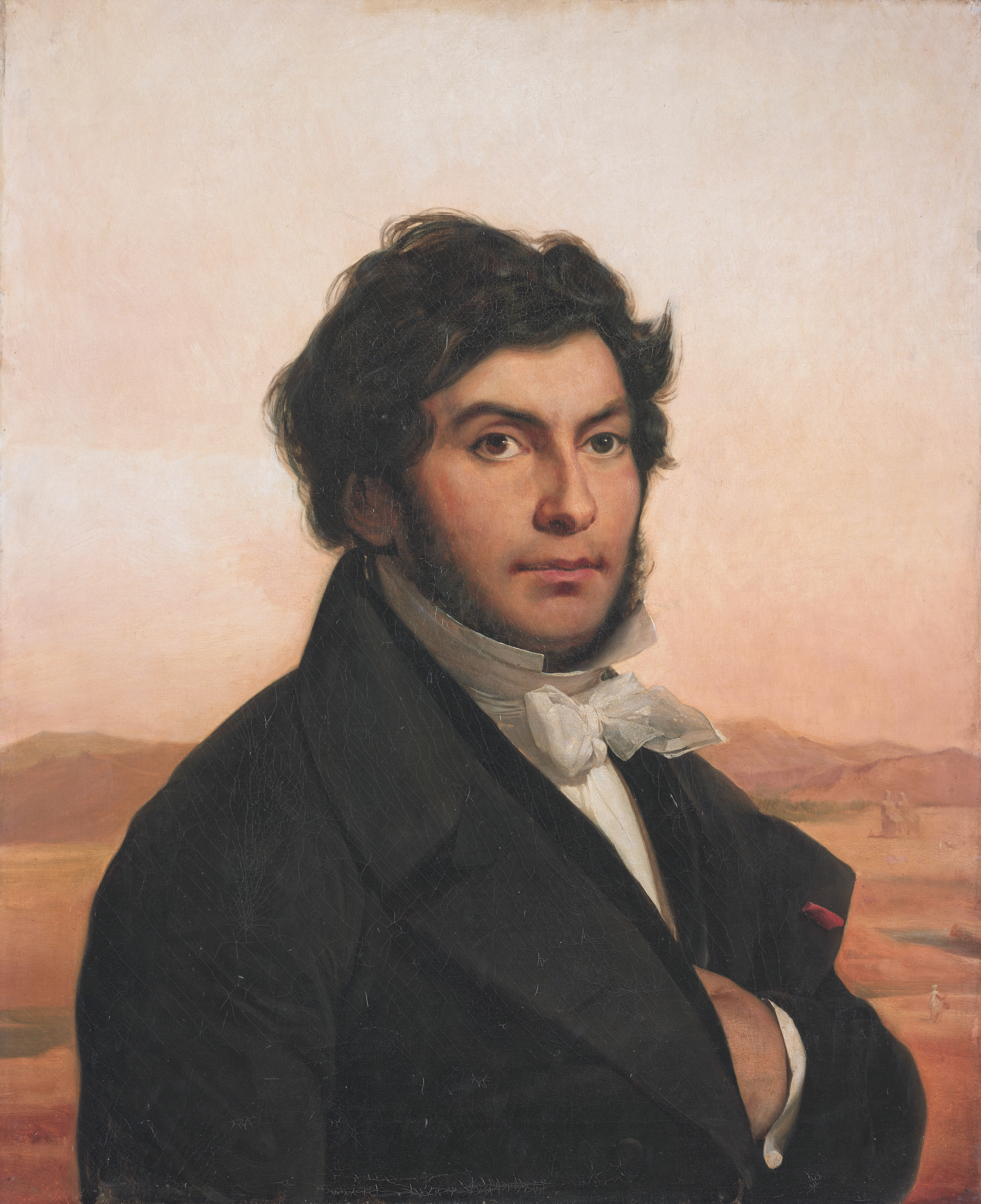
Jean-François Champollion

- January 24 – Daniel Sykes, English politician (b. 1766)
- January 26 – Alexander Cochrane, British admiral (b. 1758)
- January 27 – Andrew Bell, Scottish educationalist, founder of Madras College, India (b. 1753)
- February 2 – Ignacio López Rayón, leader of the Mexican War of Independence (b. 1773)
- February 3 – George Crabbe, English poet and naturalist (b. 1754)
- March 4 – Jean-François Champollion, French Egyptologist (b. 1790)
- March 10 – Muzio Clementi, Italian composer and pianist (b. 1752)
- March 15 – Otto Wilhelm Masing, Estonian linguist (b. 1763)
- March 22 – Johann Wolfgang von Goethe, German writer (b. 1749)
- March 29 – Maria Theresa of Austria-Este, Queen of Sardinia (b. 1773)
- April 3 – Jean Baptiste Gay, vicomte de Martignac, Prime Minister of France (b. 1778)
- April 12 – Shadrach Bond, American politician and the first governor of Illinois (b. 1773)
- April 18 – Jeanne-Elisabeth Chaudet, French painter (b. 1761)
- May 13 – Georges Cuvier, French zoologist (b. 1769)
- May 23 – William Grant, British lawyer, politician and judge (b. 1752)
- May 28 – Nicolas Bergasse, French lawyer (b. 1750)
- May 31 – Évariste Galois, French mathematician (b. 1811)
- June 1 – Jean Maximilien Lamarque, French general and politician (b. 1770)
- June 5 – Kaʻahumanu, queen consort of Hawaii (b. 1768)
- June 6 – Jeremy Bentham, English philosopher (b. 1748)
- June 10 – Joseph Hiester, American politician (b. 1752)
- June 21 – Princess Amalie of Hesse-Darmstadt (b. 1754)
- June 23 – James Hall, Scottish geologist (b. 1761)

=== July–December ===
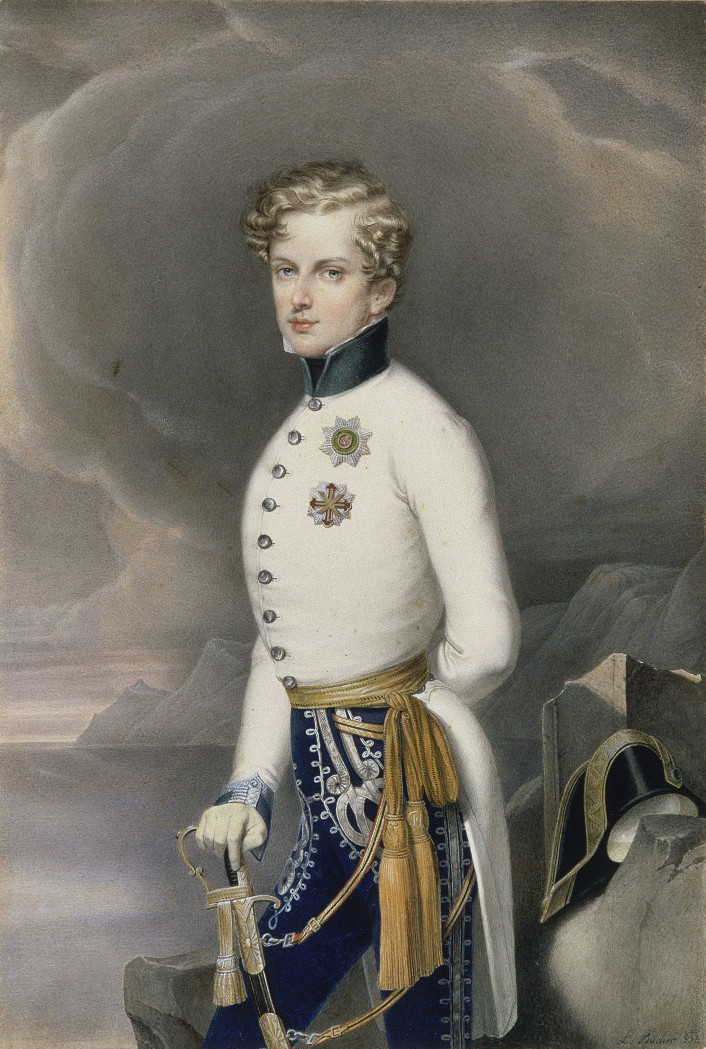
Napoleon II

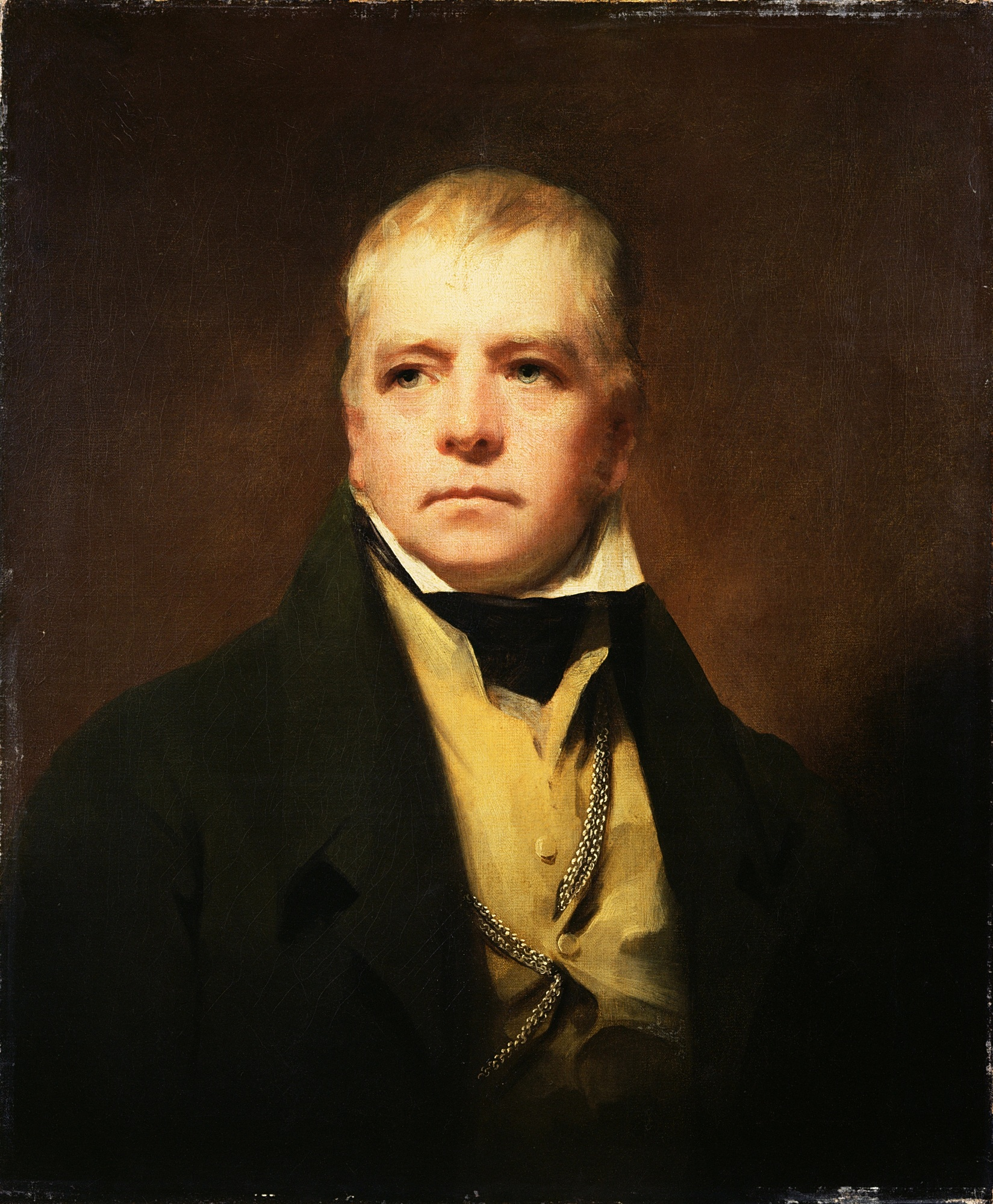
Walter Scott

- July 22 – Napoleon II of France (b. 1811)
- July 31 – Edward Abbott, Australian soldier, politician and judge (b. 1766)
- August 24 – Nicolas Léonard Sadi Carnot, French military engineer and physicist (b. 1796)
- September 1 – Joseph Kinghorn, Particular Baptist Minister (b. 1766)
- September 2 – Franz Xaver von Zach, Austrian scientific editor and astronomer (b. 1754)
- September 21 – Sir Walter Scott, Scottish poet and novelist (b. 1771)
- September 27 – Karl Christian Friedrich Krause, German philosopher (b. 1781)
- October 11 – Thomas Hardy, British political reformer (b. 1752)
- October 31 – Antonio Scarpa, Italian anatomist (b. 1752)
- November 8 – Marie-Jeanne de Lalande, French astronomer and mathematician (b. 1768)
- November 12
  - Henry Eckford, Scottish-born American shipbuilder, naval architect, industrial engineer, and entrepreneur (b. 1775)
  - Barnaba Oriani, Italian priest (b. 1752)
- November 14 – Charles Carroll of Carrollton, signer of the United States Declaration of Independence and U.S. Senator (b. 1737)
- November 15 – Jean-Baptiste Say, French economist, originator of Say's law (b. 1767)
- December 18 – Philip Freneau, American poet and journalist (b. 1752)
- December 29 – James Hillhouse, American politician and congressman from Connecticut, 1791 until 1810 (b. 1754)
- undated – Birgithe Kühle, Norwegian journalist (b. 1762)

1833

=== January–June ===
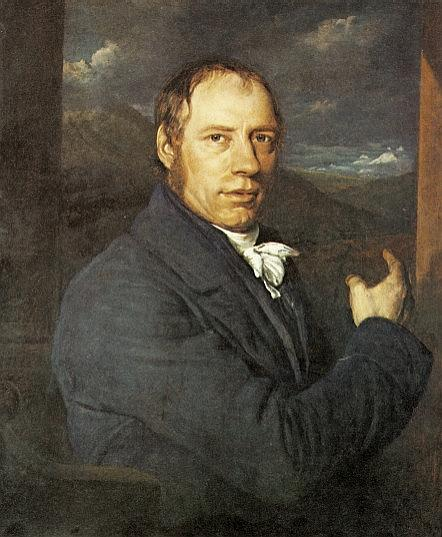
Richard Trevithick

- January 10 – Adrien-Marie Legendre, French mathematician (b. 1752)
- January 16 – Princess Paula of Brazil (b. 1823)
- January 16 – Nannette Streicher, German piano maker, composer, music educator and writer (b. 1769)
- January 16 – Banastre Tarleton, British general, politician (b. 1754)
- January 23 – Edward Pellew, 1st Viscount Exmouth, British admiral (b. 1757)
- March 13 – William Bradley, British naval officer, cartographer (b. 1758)
- April 6 – Adamantios Korais, Greek scholar (b. 1748)
- April 7
  - Antoni Radziwiłł, Polish politician (b. 1775)
  - Jacques Réattu, French artist (b. 1760)
- April 22 – Richard Trevithick, English inventor (b. 1771)
- May 5 – Sophia Campbell, Australian artist (b. 1777)
- May 15 – Edmund Kean, British actor (b. 1787)
- May 23 – Francesca Anna Canfield, American linguist, poet and translator (b. 1803)
- June 1 – Oliver Wolcott Jr., American lawyer, politician, 2nd United States Secretary of the Treasury, 24th Governor of Connecticut (b. 1760)
- June 2 – Simon Byrne, Irish prizefighter (b. 1806)

=== July–December ===
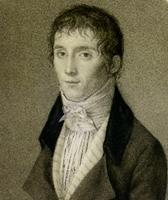
Nicéphore Niépce

- July 2 – Gervasio Antonio de Posadas, Argentine leader (b. 1757)
- July 5 – Nicéphore Niépce, French photography pioneer (b. 1765)
- July 11 – Yagan, Noongar indigenous Australian warrior (killed) (b. c. 1795)
- July 12 – Samuel Sterett, American politician (b. 1758)
- July 19 – George Leveson-Gower, 1st Duke of Sutherland, British landowner (b. 1758)
- July 20 – Ninian Edwards, American politician, Governor of and Senator from Illinois (b. 1775)
- July 22 – Joseph Forlenze, Italian ophthalmologist (b. 1757)
- July 23 – Anselmo de la Cruz, Chilean political figure (b. 1777)
- July 26 – Thomas Knapton, English mariner, executed (b. c. 1816)
- July 29 – William Wilberforce, English politician, abolitionist (b. 1759)
- August 9 – Godfrey Higgins, English archaeologist (b. 1772)
- August 14 – Placidus a Spescha, Swiss mountain climber (b. 1752)
- September – James Farquhar, Scottish politician (b. 1764)
- September 7 – Hannah More, English religious writer, Romantic, and philanthropist (b. 1745)
- September 15 – Arthur Hallam, English poet (b. 1811)
- September 27 – Ram Mohan Roy, Hindu reformer (b. 1772)
- September 29 – King Ferdinand VII of Spain (b. 1784)
- October 3 – François, marquis de Chasseloup-Laubat, French general (b. 1754)
- October 4 – Maria Jane Jewsbury, English poet and literary reviewer (b. 1800)
- October 16
  - Andrey Bolotov, Russian agriculturalist and memoirist (b. 1738)
  - Meno Haas, German-born copperplate engraver (b. 1752)
- November 16 – John McMillan, Presbyterian minister, missionary in Pennsylvania (b. 1752)
- November 23 – Jean-Baptiste Jourdan, French marshal (b. 1762)
- December 17 – Kaspar Hauser, German youth of uncertain origin (stabbed) (b. 1812?)

1834

=== January–June ===
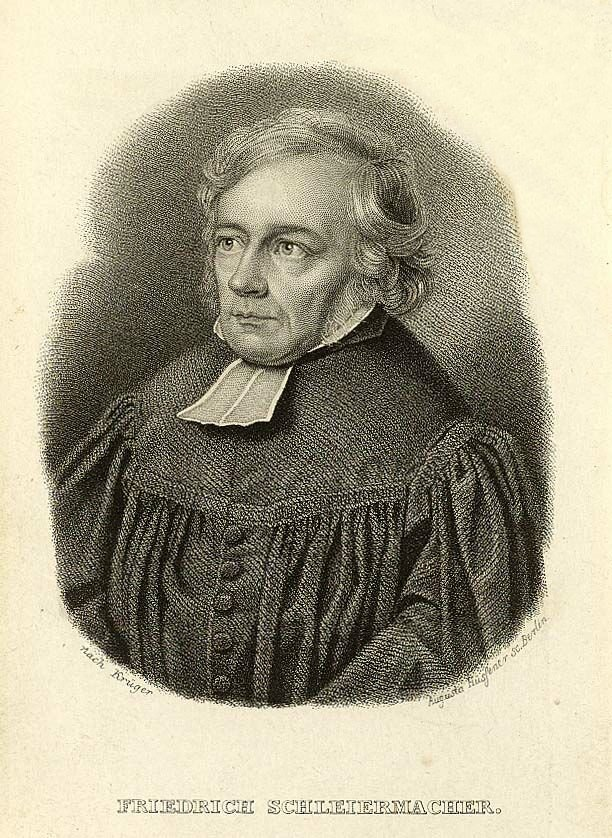
Friedrich Schleiermacher

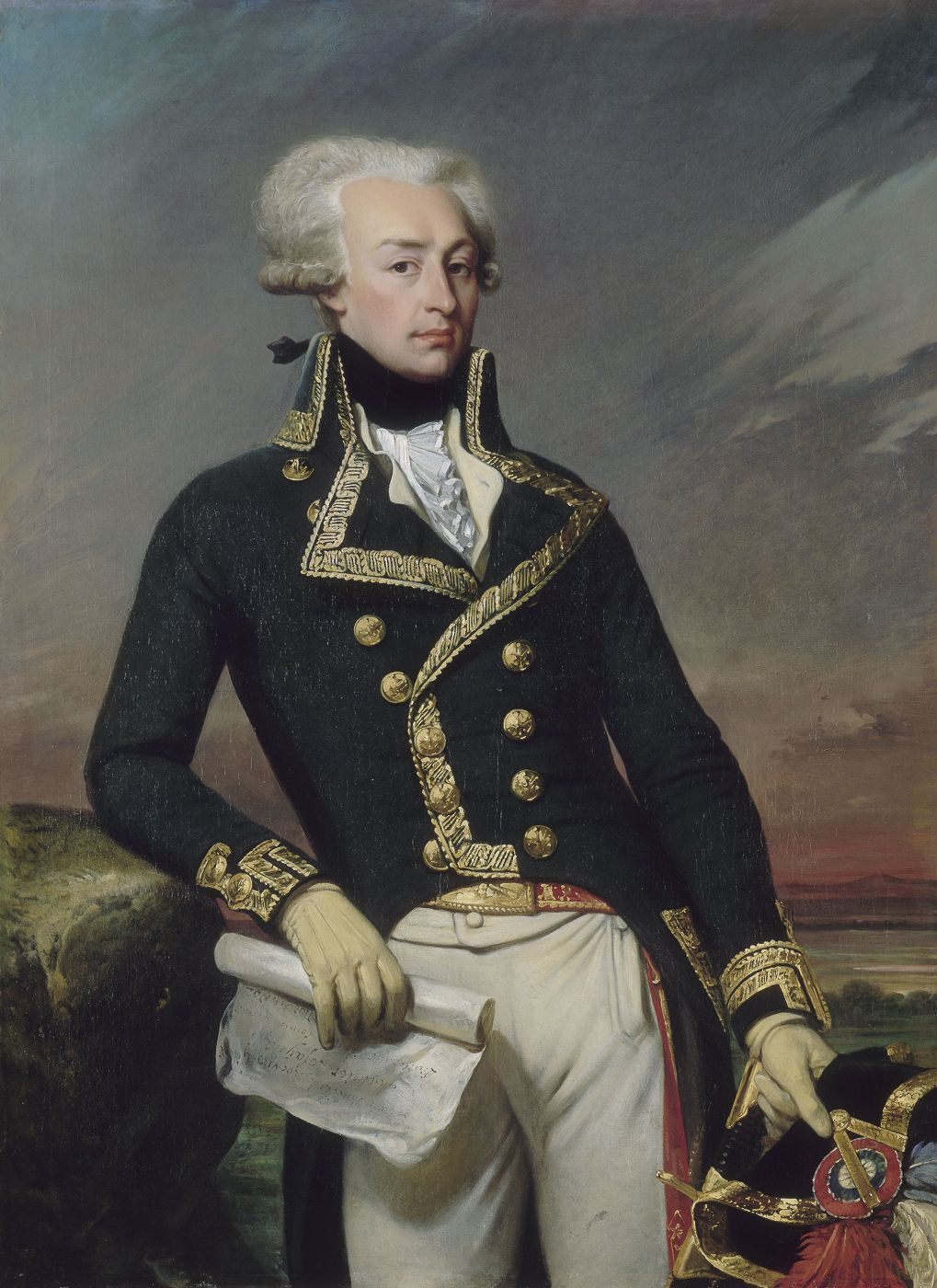
Gilbert du Motier

- January 6 – Richard Martin, Irish founder of the Society for the Prevention of Cruelty to Animals (b. 1754)
- January 12 – William Grenville, 1st Baron Grenville, Prime Minister of the United Kingdom (b. 1759)
- January 17 – Giovanni Aldini, Italian physicist (b. 1762)
- February 2 – Lorenzo Dow, American minister (b. 1777)
- February 4 – Amélie-Julie Candeille, French composer, librettist, writer, singer, actress, comedian, and instrumentalist (b. 1767)
- February 12 – Friedrich Schleiermacher, German theologian and philosopher (b. 1768)
- February 18 – William Wirt, 9th United States Attorney General (b. 1772)
- February 23 – Karl Ludwig von Knebel, German poet (b. 1744)
- March 2 – José Cecilio del Valle, first President of Central America (b. 1780)
- March 30 – Rudolph Ackermann, Anglo-German entrepreneur (b. 1764)
- April 5 – Vice-Admiral Sir Richard Goodwin Keats, Governor of Newfoundland (b. 1757)
- April 10 – John 'Merino' MacArthur, Australian farmer (b. 1767)
- April 11 – John 'Mad Jack' Fuller, English philanthropist, patron of the arts and sciences (b. 1757)
- April 29 – Grigore IV Ghica, prince of Wallachia (b. 1755)
- May 9 – Turki bin Abdullah bin Muhammad, founder of the First Saudi State
- May 20 – Gilbert du Motier, Marquis de Lafayette, French nobleman, soldier (b. 1757)
- May 31 – Shaikh Khalifa bin Salman bin Ahmed Al Khalifa, Deputy Ruler of Bahrain (b. c. 1783)

=== July–December ===
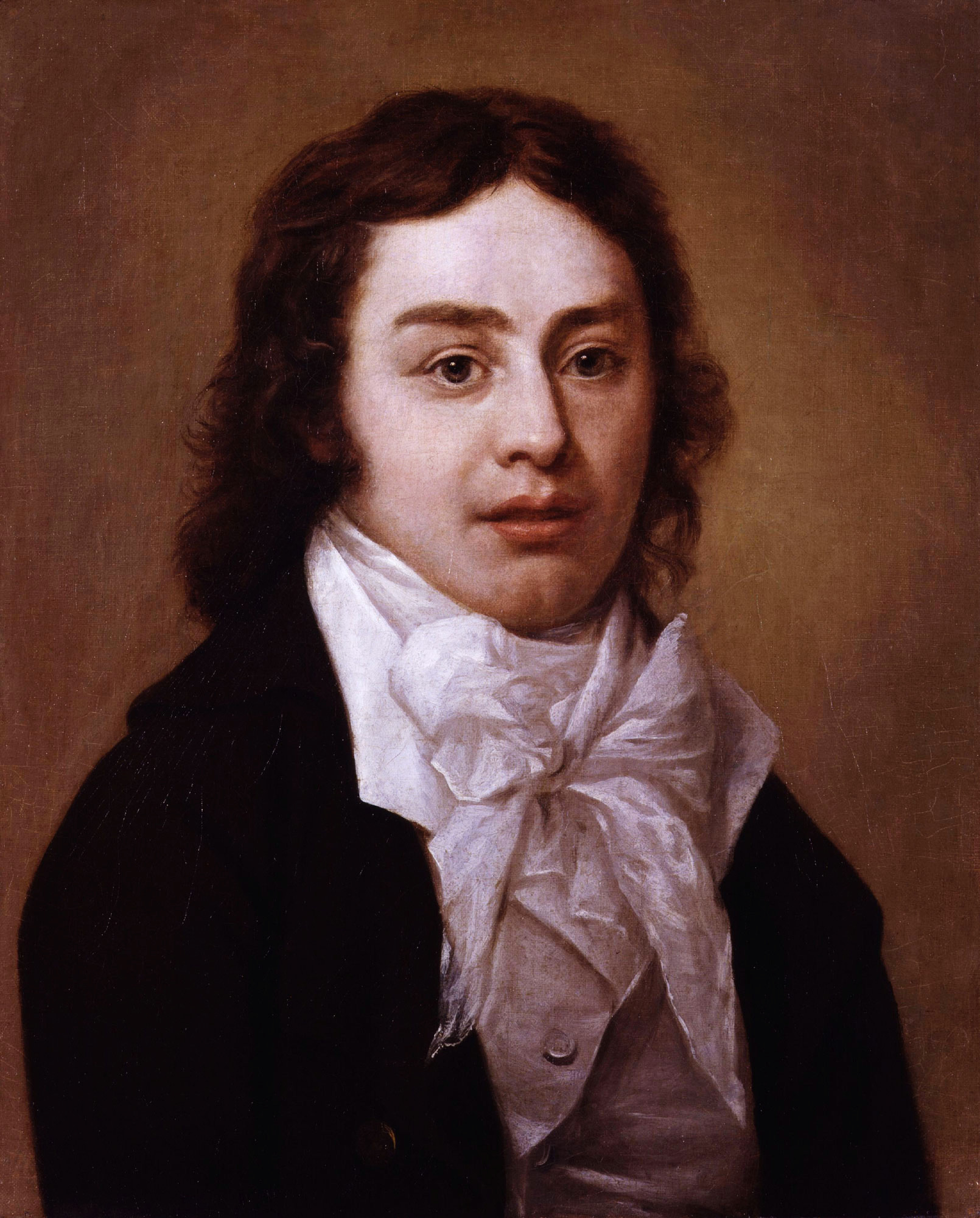
Samuel Taylor Coleridge

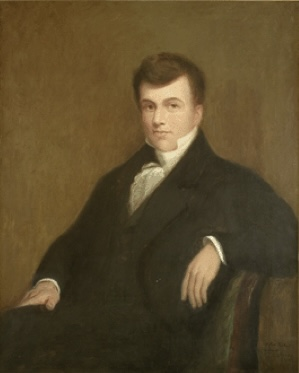
Jonathan Jennings

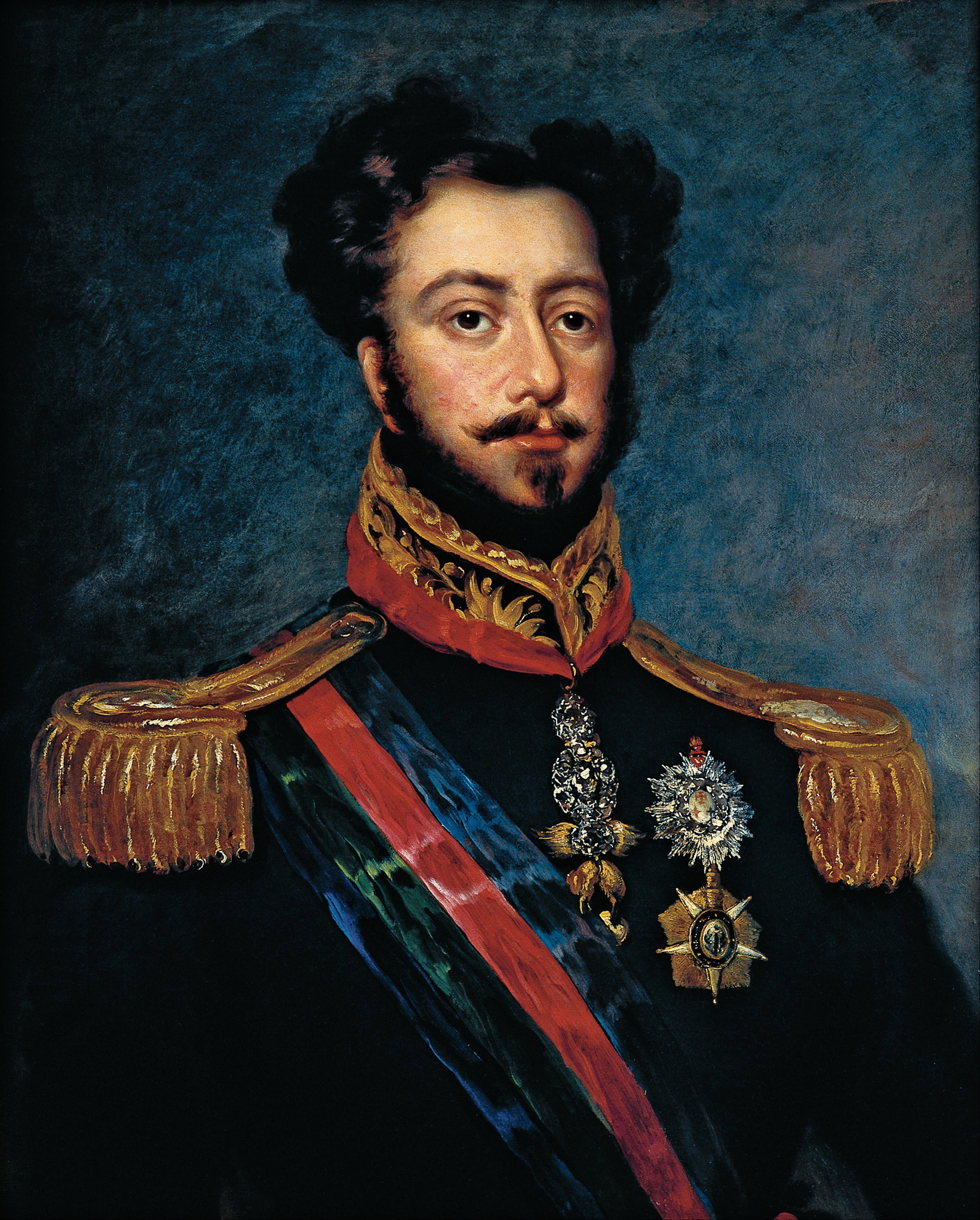
Pedro I of Brazil

- July 12 – David Douglas, Scottish botanist (b. 1799)
- July 14 – Edmond-Charles Genêt, French ambassador to the United States during the French Revolution (b. 1763)
- July 19 – Károly Hadaly, Hungarian mathematician (b. 1743)
- July 25 – Samuel Taylor Coleridge, English writer (b. 1772)
- July 26 – Jonathan Jennings, American politician and the first governor of Indiana (b. 1784)
- August 1 – Robert Morrison, British Protestant missionary to China (b. 1782)
- August 7 – Joseph Marie Jacquard, French inventor (b. 1752)
- August 17 – Husein Gradaščević, Bosnian rebel leader (b. 1802)
- September 2 – Thomas Telford, Scottish engineer (b. 1757)
- September 5 – Thomas Lee, English architect (b. 1794)
- September 9 – James Weddell, Antarctic explorer (b. 1787)
- September 15 – William H. Crawford, American politician, judge (b. 1772)
- September 16 – William Blackwood, Scottish writer (b. 1776)
- September 24 – Emperor Pedro I of Brazil (b. 1798)
- October 5 – María Josefa Pimentel, Duchess of Osuna (b. 1752)
- October 8 – François-Adrien Boieldieu, French composer (b. 1775)
- October 11 – William Napier, 9th Lord Napier, British Navy officer, politician and diplomat (b. 1786)
- October 21 – Edward Smith-Stanley, 12th Earl of Derby (b. 1752)
- October 23 – Fath Ali Shah Qajar, King of Iran (b. 1772)
- October 31 – Éleuthère Irénée du Pont, French-American chemical manufacturer (b. 1771)
- November 2 – Maria Teresa Poniatowska, Polish aristocrat (b. 1760)
- November 27 – Rosalie de Constant, Swiss naturalist (b. 1758)
- December 23 – Thomas Malthus, English economist, political philosopher (b. 1766)
- December 27 – Charles Lamb, English essayist (b. 1775)
- December 31 – João Batista Gonçalves Campos, intellectual leader of the Cabanagem revolt (b. 1782)

1835

=== January–June ===
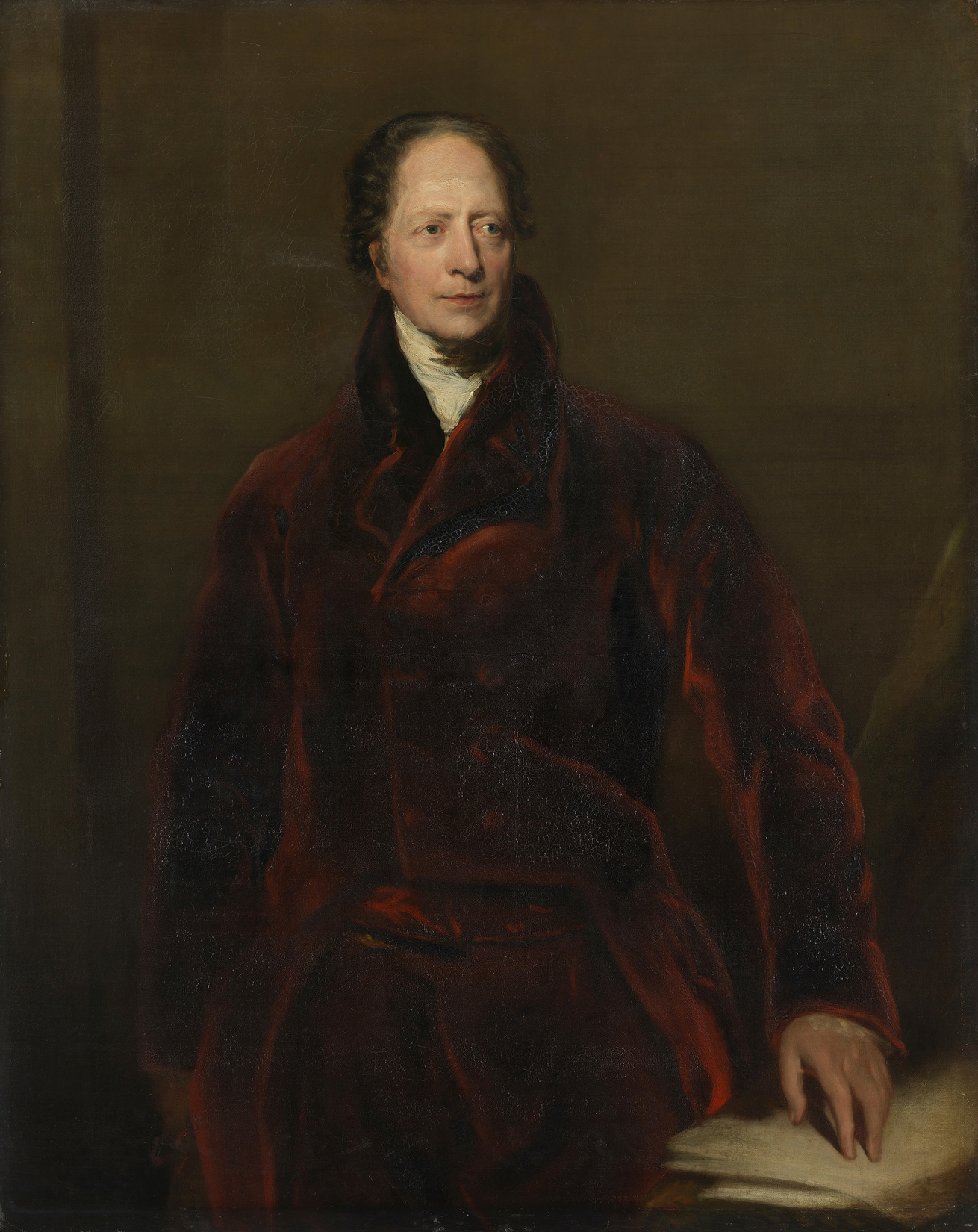
Wilhelm von Humboldt

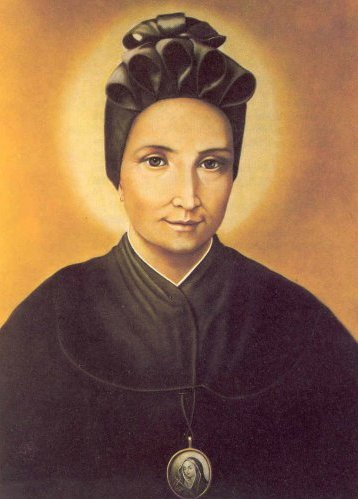
Saint Magdalene of Canossa

- January 1 – Mátyás Godina, Slovene Lutheran pastor, writer, and teacher (b. 1768)
- February 8 – Guillaume Dupuytren, French anatomist, military surgeon (b. 1777)
- February 15
  - Nathan Dane, American politician (b. 1752)
  - Henry Hunt, British politician (b. 1773)
- March 2 – Francis II, Holy Roman Emperor (b. 1768)
- March 18 – Christian Günther von Bernstorff, Danish, Prussian statesman, diplomat (b. 1769)
- March 28 – Auguste de Beauharnais, Prince consort of Queen Maria II of Portugal (b. 1810)
- March 30 – Richard Sharp, English hat-maker, banker, merchant, poet, critic, Member of Parliament, and conversationalist
- April 1 – Józef Zeydlitz, Polish military leader (b. 1755)
- April 8 – Wilhelm von Humboldt, German linguist, philosopher (b. 1767)
- April 10 – Magdalene of Canossa, Italian Catholic religious professed, saint (b. 1774)
- April 21 – Samuel Slater, American industrialist (b. 1768)
- May 8 – Francisca Zubiaga y Bernales, first lady of Peru, controversial socialite (b. 1803)
- May 13 – John Nash, English architect (b. 1752)
- June 18 – William Cobbett, English journalist, author (b. 1763)
- June 24 – Andreas Vokos Miaoulis, Greek admiral (b. 1768)
- June 25 – Ebenezer Pemberton, American educator (b. 1746)

=== July–December ===
- July 6 – John Marshall, influential American Chief Justice of the United States Supreme Court (b. 1755)
- July 15 – Izabela Czartoryska, Polish magnate princess (b. 1746)
- July 28 – Édouard Mortier, Duke of Trévise, French marshal (b. 1768)
- August 18 – Friedrich Stromeyer, German chemist (born 1776)
- September 23
  - Georg Adlersparre, Swedish military leader (b. 1760)
  - Vincenzo Bellini, Italian composer (b. 1801)
- November 14 – James Freeman, first American clergyman to call himself a Unitarian (b. 1759)
- November 20 – Joseph von Baader, German railway pioneer (b. 1763)
- November 29 – Princess Catharina of Württemberg, wife of Jérôme Bonaparte (b. 1783)
- December 17 – Pierre Louis Roederer, French politician, economist, and historian (b. 1754)
- December 22 – David Hosack, American physician and educator, attending doctor at the Hamilton-Burr duel (b. 1769)

=== Unknown ===
- Sally Hemings – American-born slave, concubine to Thomas Jefferson (b. c. 1773)
- Ishak Efendi – Ottoman engineer, translator (b. c. 1774)

1836

=== January–June ===
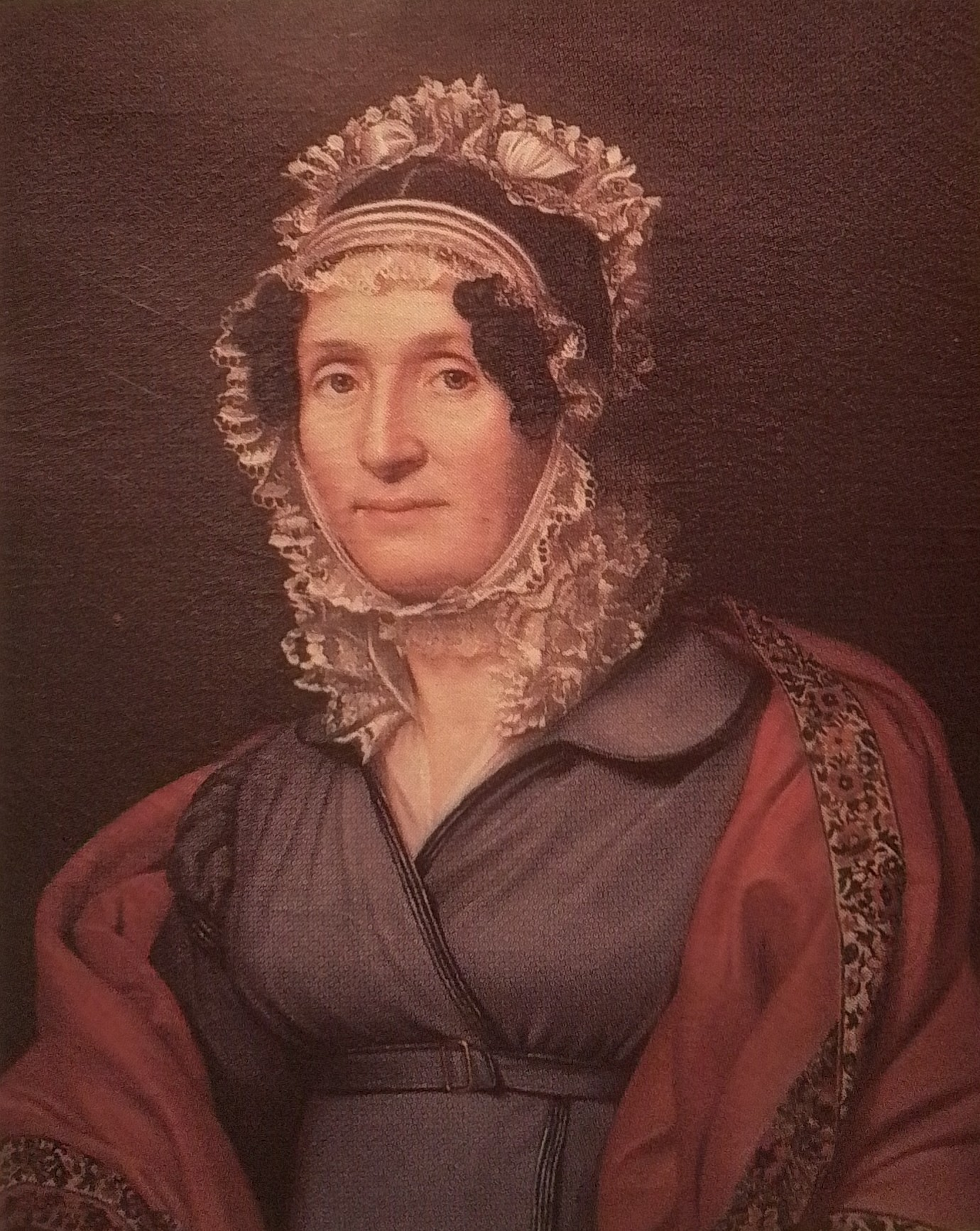
Madame Mère, mother of Napoleon I

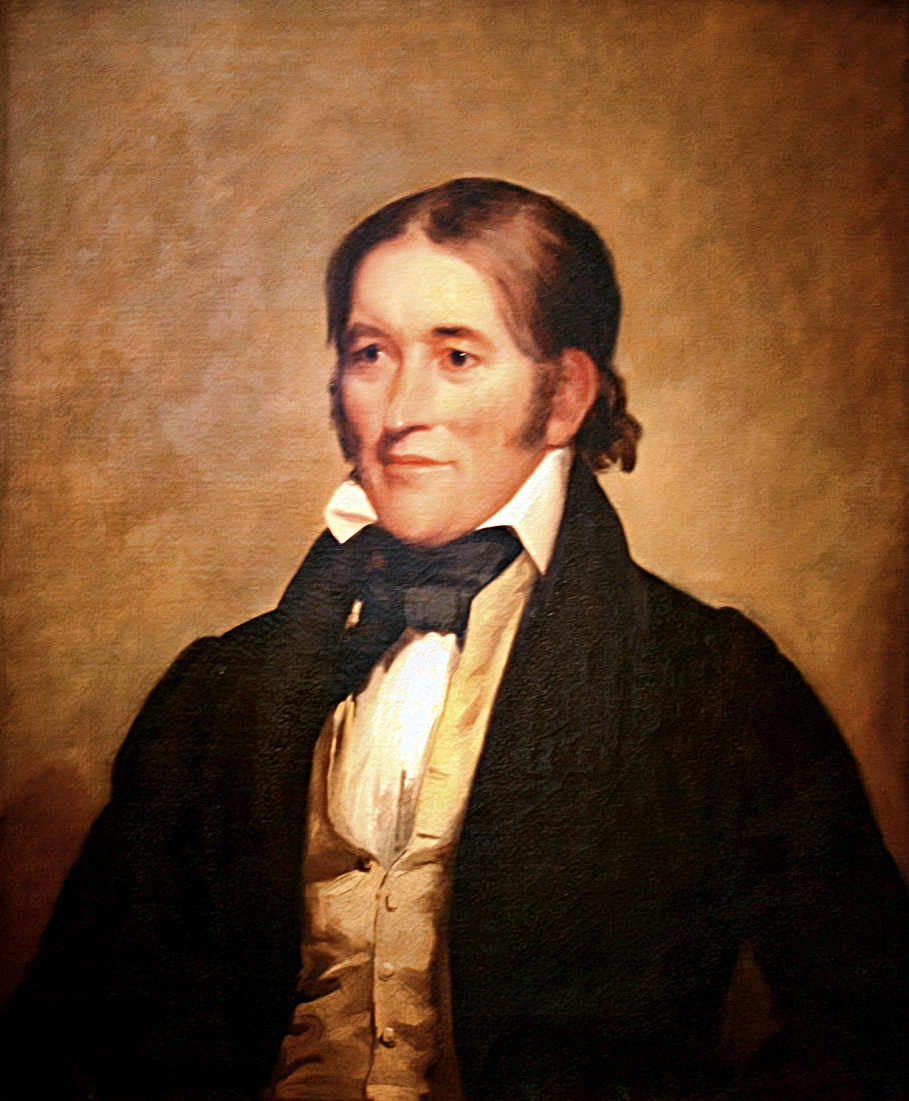
Davy Crockett

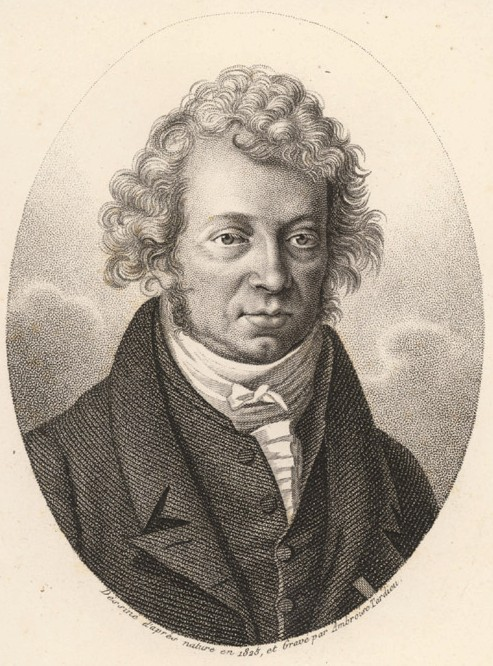
André-Marie Ampère

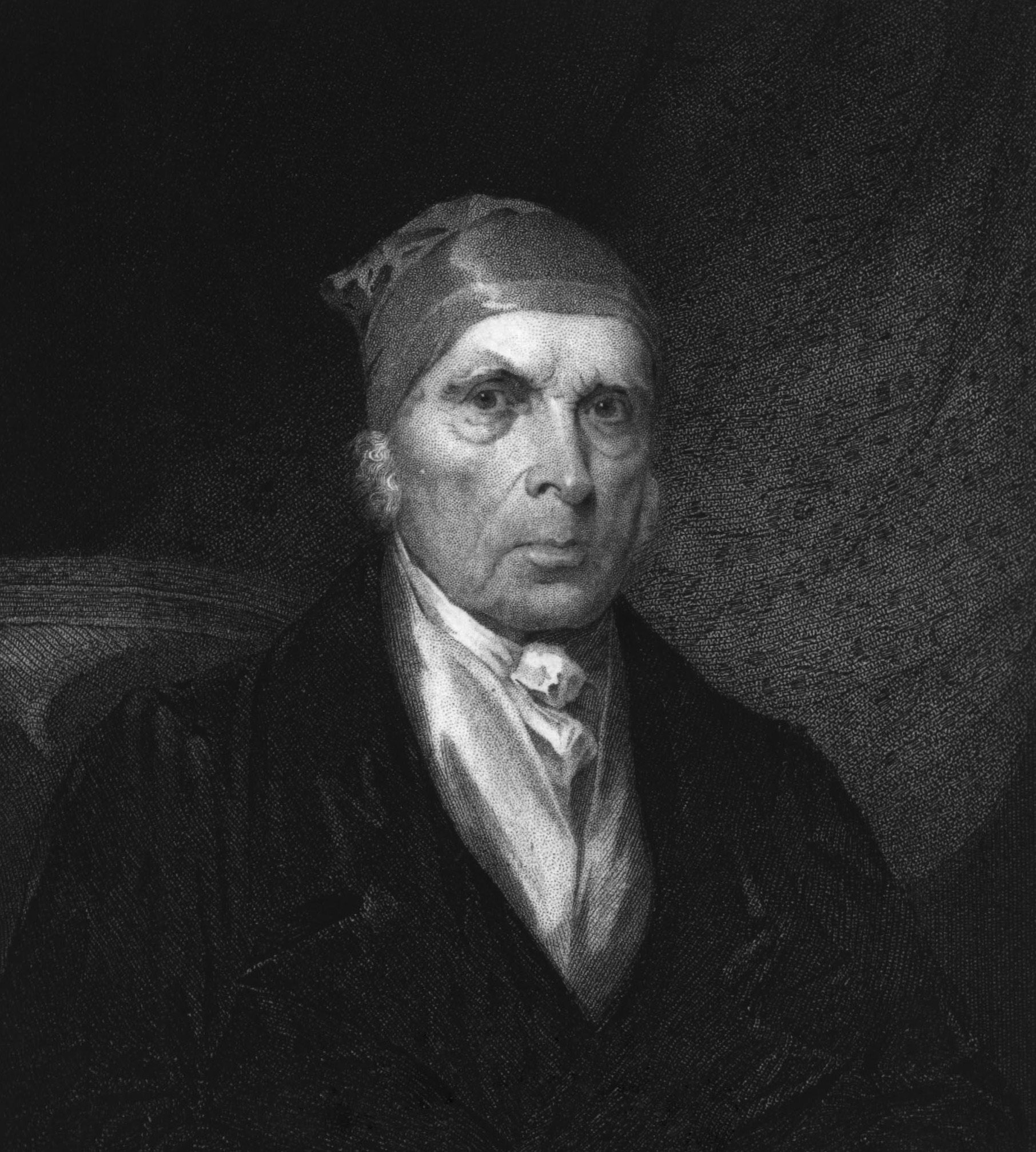
James Madison

- January 1 – Bernhard Meyer, German physician, ornithologist (b. 1767)
- January 11 – John Molson, Canadian entrepreneur (b. 1763)
- January 21 – Ferenc Novák, Hungarian Slovene writer (b. 1791)
- January 30 – Betsy Ross, maker, designer of the first American flag (b. 1752)
- January 31 – John Cheyne, British physician, surgeon and author (b. 1777)
- February 1 – Marie-Anne Pierrette Paulze, French chemist (b. 1758)
- February 2 – Madame Mère (Letizia Ramolino Bonaparte) mother of Napoleon I (b. 1749)
- February 18 – Cornplanter, native American (Seneca) chief (b. 1750)
- February 21 – William Van Mildert, last Prince Bishop of Durham, and founder of Durham University (b. 1765)
- March 2 – James Grant, Texas politician, physician and military participant in the Texas Revolution (b. 1793)
- March 6 (at the Alamo)
  - James Bowie, Texan revolutionary (b. 1796)
  - Davy Crockett, American frontiersman, Congressman and soldier (b. 1786)
  - William Barret Travis, Texan revolutionary (b. 1809)
  - James Bonham, Alamo defender (b. 1807)
  - Micajah Autry, Alamo defender (b. 1793)
  - Almaron Dickinson, American soldier (b. 1800)
  - Jośe Gregorio Esparza, Alamo defender (b. 1802)
- March 16 – Nathaniel Bowditch, American mathematician (b. 1773)
- March 27 – James Fannin, Texas revolutionary (b. 1804)
- April 7 – William Godwin, English writer (b. 1756)
- April 21 – Manuel Fernández Castrillón, Mexican general (b. 1780)
- April 29 – Simon Kenton, American frontiersman, Revolutionary militia general (b. 1755)
- May 13 – John Littlejohn, American sheriff and Methodist preacher (b. 1756)
- May 23 – Edward Livingston, American jurist, statesman (b. 1764)
- June 10 – André-Marie Ampère, French physicist (b. 1775)
- June 20 – Emmanuel Joseph Sieyès, French cleric, constitutional theorist (b. 1748)
- June 23 – James Mill, British historian, economist, political theorist, and philosopher (b. 1773)
- June 28 – James Madison, 85, 4th President of the United States (b. 1751)

=== July–December ===
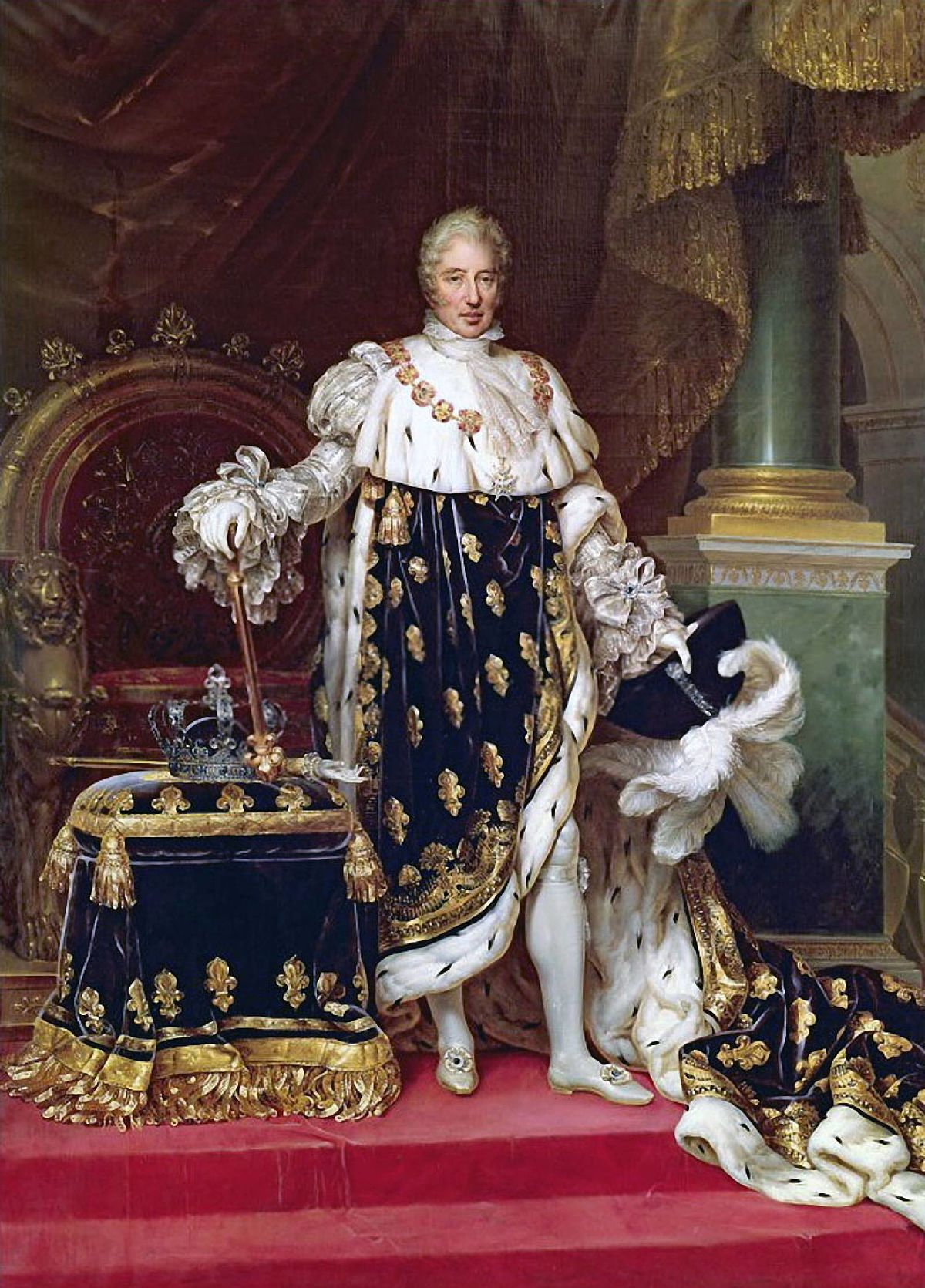
Charles X of France

- August 20 – Agnes Bulmer, English poet (b. 1775)
- August 21 – Claude-Louis Navier, French engineer, physicist (b. 1785)
- August 25 – Christoph Wilhelm Hufeland, German physician (b. 1762)
- September 5 – Ferdinand Raimund, Austrian playwright (b. 1790)
- September 12 – Christian Dietrich Grabbe, German playwright (b. 1801)
- September 14 – Aaron Burr, 3rd Vice President of the United States (b. 1756)
- September 17 – Antoine Laurent de Jussieu, French botanist (b. 1748)
- September 23
  - Maria Malibran, Spanish-French operatic singer (b. 1808)
  - Andrey Razumovsky, Russian diplomat (b. 1752)
- November – Tenskwatawa, Shawnee prophet, political leader (b. 1775)
- November 5 – Karel Hynek Mácha, Czech poet (b. 1810)
- November 6 – King Charles X of France (b. 1757)
- November 16 – Christiaan Hendrik Persoon, Dutch mycologist (b. 1761)
- November 26 – John Loudon McAdam, Scottish engineer, road-builder (b. 1756)
- December 27 – Stephen F. Austin, American pioneer (b. 1793)

=== 1836 in Popular Culture ===
1836 serves as the start date for the grand strategy video games Victoria: An Empire Under the Sun, Victoria II, and Victoria 3 by Paradox Development Studio.

1837

=== January–June ===
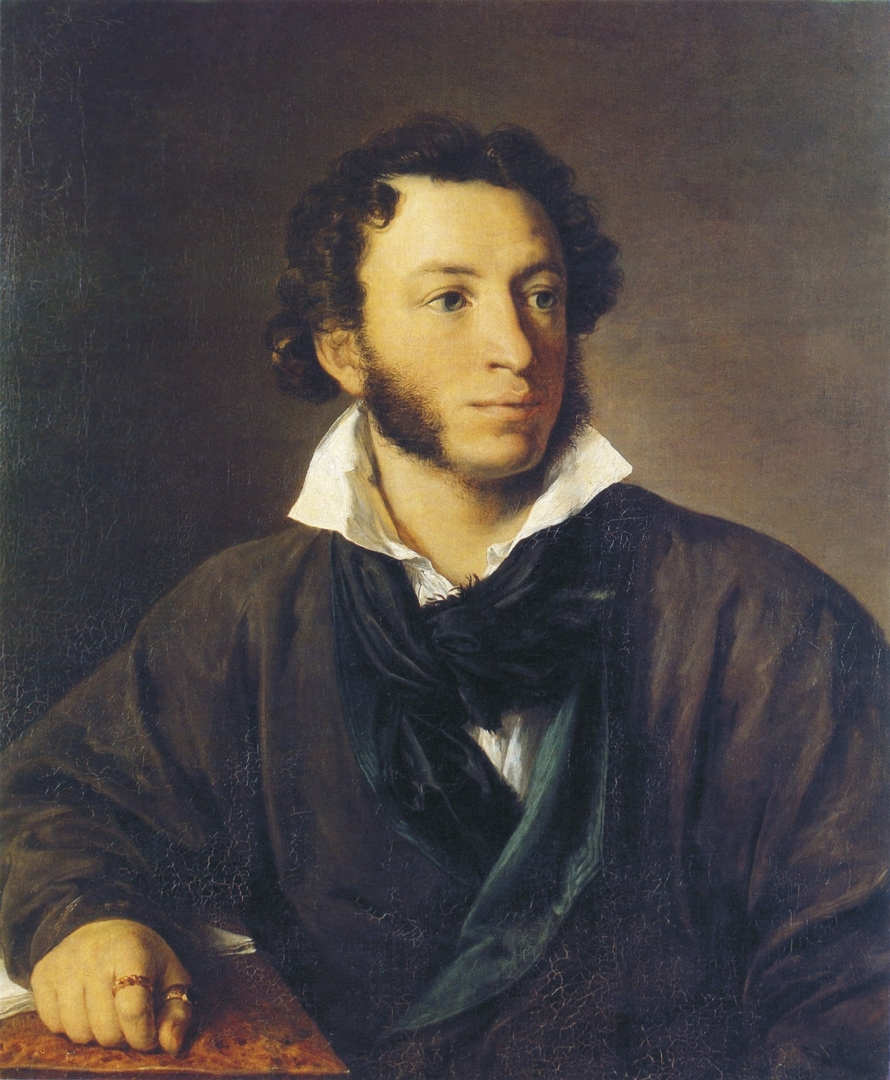
Alexander Pushkin

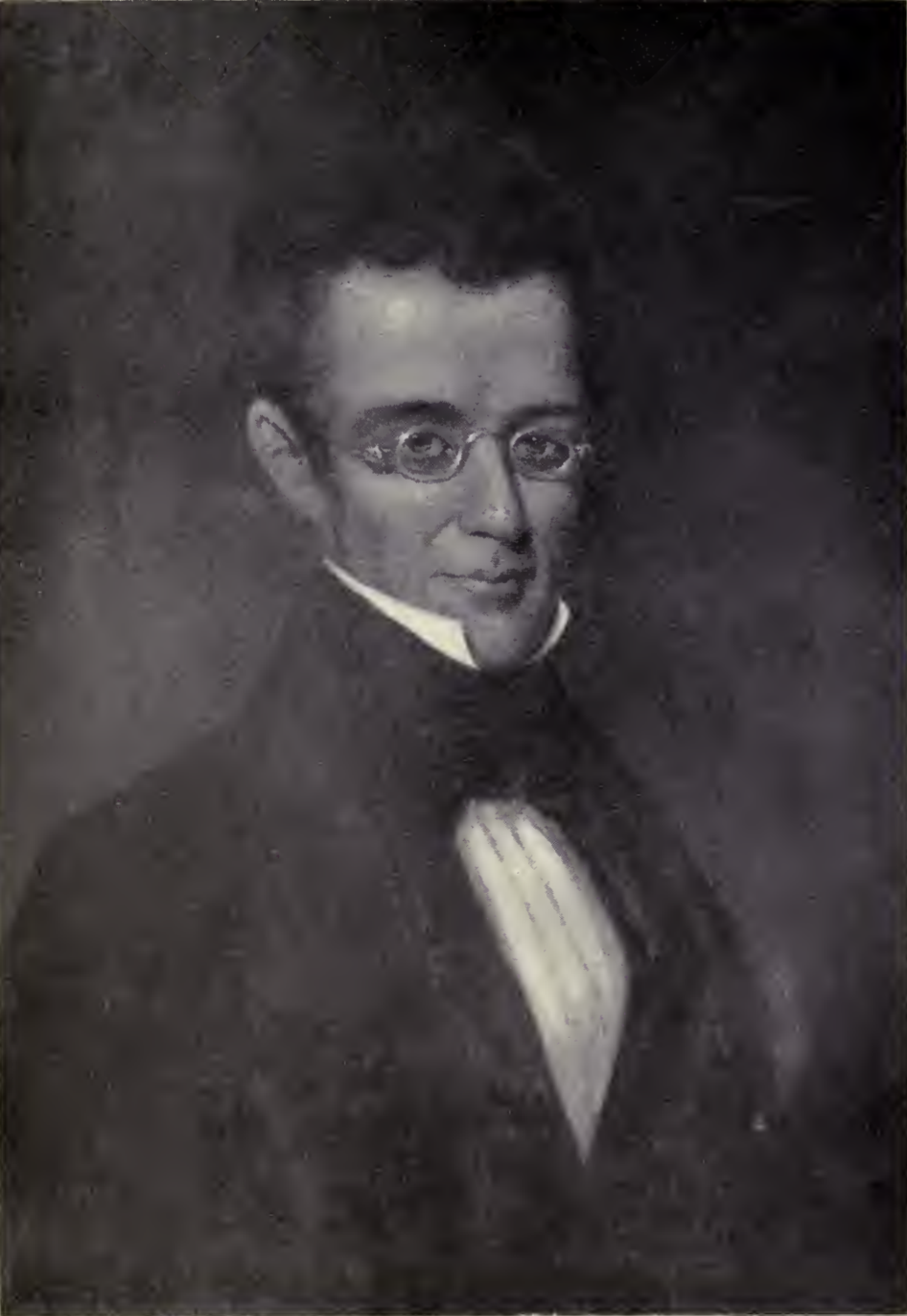
Osgood Johnson

- January 8 – Duke Wilhelm in Bavaria, great-grandfather of Empress Elisabeth of Austria (b. 1752)
- January 20 – John Soane, British architect (b. 1753)
- January 23 – John Field, Irish composer (b. 1782)
- February 7 – Gustav IV Adolf, deposed King of Sweden (b. 1778)
- February 10 – Alexander Pushkin, Russian author, wound received in duel (b. 1799)
- February 13 – Mariano José de Larra, Spanish author, suicide (b. 1809)
- February 19 – Georg Büchner, German playwright, typhus (b. 1813)
- February 23 – Friedrich Ludwig Weidig, German Protestant theologian, pastor and radical, suicide (b. 1791)
- March 31 – John Constable, English painter (b. 1776)
- April 4 – Louis-Sébastien Lenormand, French chemist, physicist and inventor (b. 1757)
- April 28 – Joseph Souham, French general (b. 1760)
- May 5 – Niccolò Antonio Zingarelli, Italian composer (b. 1752)
- May 20 – Prince Frederick of Hesse-Kassel (b. 1747)
- June 14 – Giacomo Leopardi, Italian writer (b. 1798)
- June 29 – Nathaniel Macon, American politician (b. 1757)
- June 20 – King William IV of the United Kingdom and Hannover (b. 1765)

=== July–December ===
- July 18 – Vincenzo Borg, Maltese merchant, rebel leader (b. 1777)
- August 12 – Pierre Laromiguière, French philosopher (b. 1756)
- September 7 – Fabian Gottlieb von Osten-Sacken, Russian military leader (b. 1752)
- September 21 – Pieter Vreede, Dutch politician (b. 1750)
- September 28 – Akbar II, last Mughal emperor of India (b. 1760)
- October 1 – Robert Clark, American politician (b. 1777)
- October 10 – Charles Fourier, French philosopher (b. 1772)
- October 12 – Charles-Marie Denys de Damrémont, French governor-general of French Algeria (killed during the siege of Constantine) (b. 1783)
- October 17
  - Johann Nepomuk Hummel, Austrian composer (b. 1778)
  - Peter Lebeck, French trapper and namesake of Lebec, California (birth unknown)
- November 7 – Elijah P. Lovejoy, American abolitionist (b. 1802)
- November 28 – Sophie Botta, the Dark Countess, German woman of mysterious identity

=== Date unknown ===
- Anne Pépin, Senegalese Signara (b. 1747)
- Mary Dixon Kies, first American recipient of a U.S. patent (b. 1752)
- Thomas Noble, English poet and translator (b. 1772)
- Sengai Gibon, Japanese monk

1838

=== January–June ===
- January 3 – Maximilian, Hereditary Prince of Saxony (b. 1759)
- January 5 – Anthony Van Egmond, leader in Upper Canada Rebellion of 1837 (d. in jail) (b. 1778)
- January 12 – Joshua Humphreys, American naval architect (b. 1751)
- January 13 – John Scott, 1st Earl of Eldon, Lord Chancellor of Great Britain (b. 1751)
- February 21 – Silvestre de Sacy, French linguist (b. 1758)
- February 24 – Christoph Johann von Medem, German courtier (b. 1763)
- March 7 – Robert Townsend (spy), American member of the Culper Spy Ring (b. 1753)
- March 13 – Poul Martin Møller, Danish philosopher (b. 1794)
- March 16 – Nathaniel Bowditch, American mathematician (b. 1773)
- March 23 – Michael Anckarsvärd, Swedish politician (b. 1742)
- April 3 – François Carlo Antommarchi, French physician (b. 1780)
- April 6 – José Bonifácio de Andrada e Silva, Brazilian statesman, naturalist (b. 1763)
- April 9 – Piet Uys, Voortrekker leader (in battle) (b. 1797)
- May – Francisco Gómez, President of El Salvador (b. 1796)
- May 17 – Charles Maurice de Talleyrand-Périgord, French politician (b. 1754)
- May 19 – Sir Richard Hoare, English archaeologist (b. 1758)
- May 23 – Jan Willem Janssens, Governor-General of the Dutch East Indies (b. 1762)
- June 4 – Thomas Hancorne, Welsh Anglican clergyman and judicial officer (b. 1752)
- June 14 – Maximilian von Montgelas, Bavarian statesman (b. 1759)

=== July–December ===
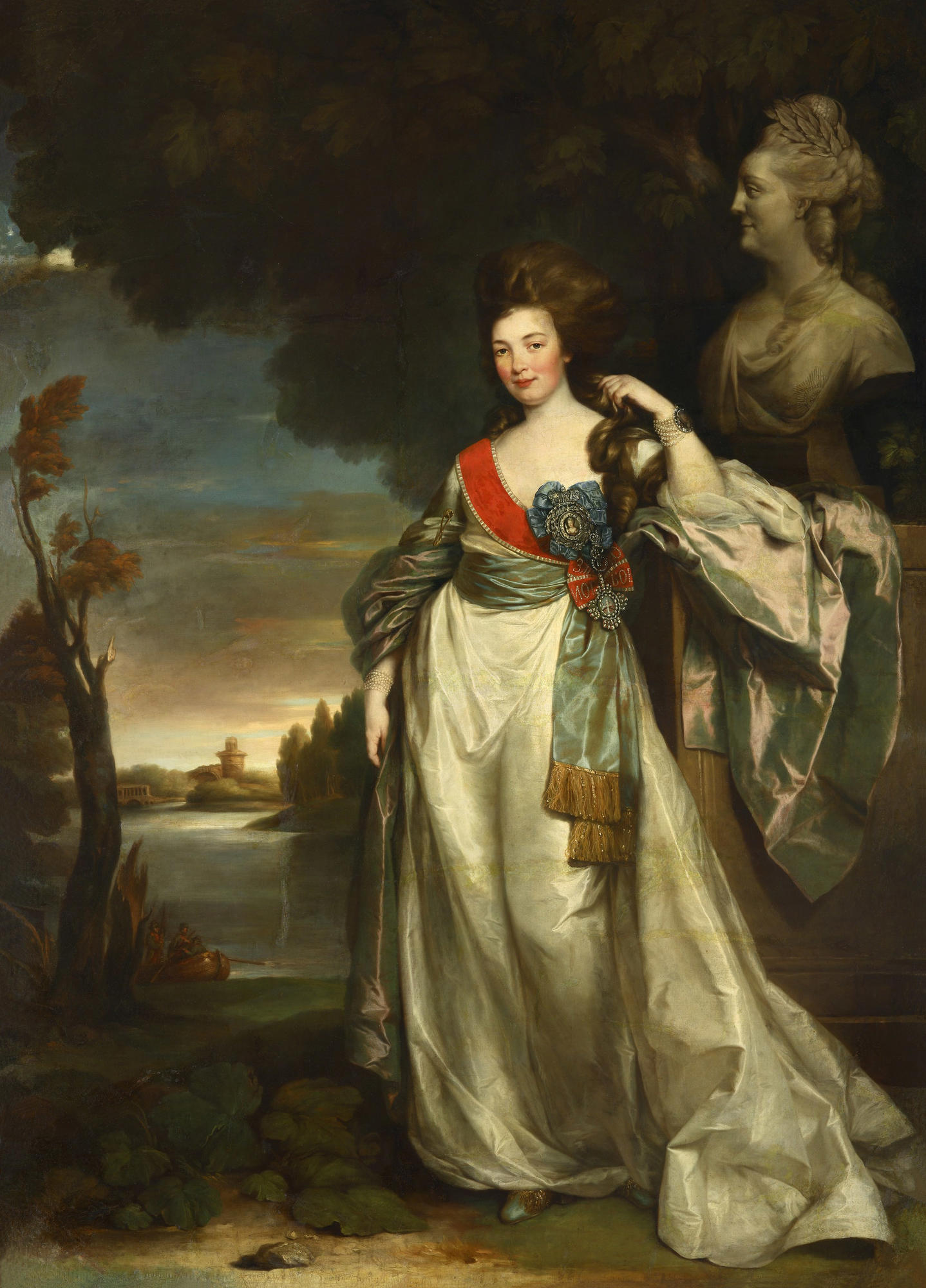
Alexandra Branitskaya

- July 19 – Christmas Evans, Welsh preacher (b. 1766)
- August 1 – John Rodgers, American naval officer (b. 1772)
- August 17 – Lorenzo Da Ponte, librettist for Mozart (b. 1n writer (b. 1781)
- September 1 – William Clark, American explorer (b. 1770)
- September 15 – Alexandra Branitskaya, Russian political activist, courtier and businessperson (b. 1754)
- September 18 – Robert Smith, 1st Baron Carrington (b. 1752)
- September 27 – Bernard Courtois, French chemist (b. 1777)
- October 1 – Charles Tennant, Scottish chemist, industrialist (b. 1768)
- October 3 – Black Hawk, Sauk Indian chief, autobiographer (b. 1767)
- October 5 – Pauline Léon, French feminist, radical (b. 1768)
- November 7 – Anne Grant, Scottish poet (b. 1755)
- November 21 – Georges Mouton, count of Lobau, Marshal of France (b. 1770)
- December 12 – Elisha Clark, American politician (b. 1752)
- December 20 – Hégésippe Moreau, French writer and poet (b. 1810)

1839

=== January–June ===
William Farquhar

- January 6 – Princess Marie of Orléans, French princess, artist, and duchess (b. 1813)
- January 7 – Jacquette Löwenhielm, Swedish noble, lady-in-waiting, and mistress of Oscar I of Sweden (b. 1797)
- January 12
  - Edward Coleman, gangster and founder of the Forty Thieves
  - Joseph Anton Koch, Austrian painter (b. 1768)
- January 14 – John Wesley Jarvis, American painter (b. 1780/1781)
- January 24 – Michele Cachia, Maltese architect, military engineer (b. 1760)
- January 28 – William Beechey, British portraitist (b. 1753)
- February 7 – Karl August Nicander, Swedish poet (b. 1799)
- February 8 – William Williams, English politician (b. 1774)
- February 10 – Pedro Romero, Spanish torero (b. 1754)
- February 12 – Moulvi Syed Qudratullah, Bengali judge (b. 1750)
- February 26 – Sybil Ludington, alleged heroine during the American Revolutionary War (b. 1761)
- March 2 – Charlotte Napoléone Bonaparte, niece of Emperor Napoleon (b. 1802)
- March 19 – Rachel Plummer, American writer, daughter of James W. Parker, and the cousin of Quanah Parker (b. 1819)
- March 20 – Caspar Voght, German businessman (b. 1752)
- March 28 – Giuseppe Siboni, Italian operatic tenor, opera director, choir conductor, and voice teacher (b. 1780)
- April 1 – Benjamin Pierce, American politician (b. 1757)
- April 2 – Hezekiah Niles, American editor, publisher (b. 1777)
- April 4 – Queen Kaahumanu II of Hawaii
- April 5 – John Tipton, American politician (b. 1786)
- April 8 – Du Pré Alexander, Irish peer, landlord and colonial administrator (b. 1777)
- April 11 – John Galt, Scottish novelist (b. 1779)
- April 15 – Christoph August Gabler, German classical composer (b. 1767)
- April 22
  - Denis Davydov, Russian general, poet (b. 1784)
  - Samuel Smith (Maryland politician), American politician (b. 1752)
  - Pär Aron Borg, Swedish educator and a pioneer in the education for the blind and deaf (b. 1776)
- May 3
  - Pehr Henrik Ling, pioneer of physical education in Sweden (b. 1776)
  - José Antonio Mexía, 19th-century Mexican general and politician (b. 1800)
- May 6 – John Batman, Australian grazier, entrepreneur, and explorer (b. 1801)
- May 11
  - Thomas Cooper, American political philosopher (b. 1759)
  - William Farquhar, First British Resident and Commandant of colonial Singapore (b. 1774)
  - Thomas Cooper, Anglo-American economist, college president, and political philosopher (b. 1759)
- May 16 – Edward Clive, British politician who sat in the House of Commons (b. 1754)
- May 17 – Archibald Alison, Scottish author (b. 1757)
- May 24 – Anna Pak Agi, Korean Martyr (b. 1782)
- May 27 – Barbara Yi, Korean Martyr (b. 1825)
- June 10 – Jacob Munch, Norwegian military officer and painter (b. 1776)
- June 19 – Joseph Paelinck, painter from the Southern Netherlands (b. 1781)
- June 23 – Lady Hester Stanhope, English archaeologist (b. 1776)
- June 27
  - Ranjit Singh, Maharaja of The Punjab (Sikh Empire) (b. 1780)
  - Allan Cunningham, English botanist and explorer (b. 1791)
- June 30 – Johan Olof Wallin, Swedish minister, orator, poet and later Archbishop (b. 1779)

=== July–December ===
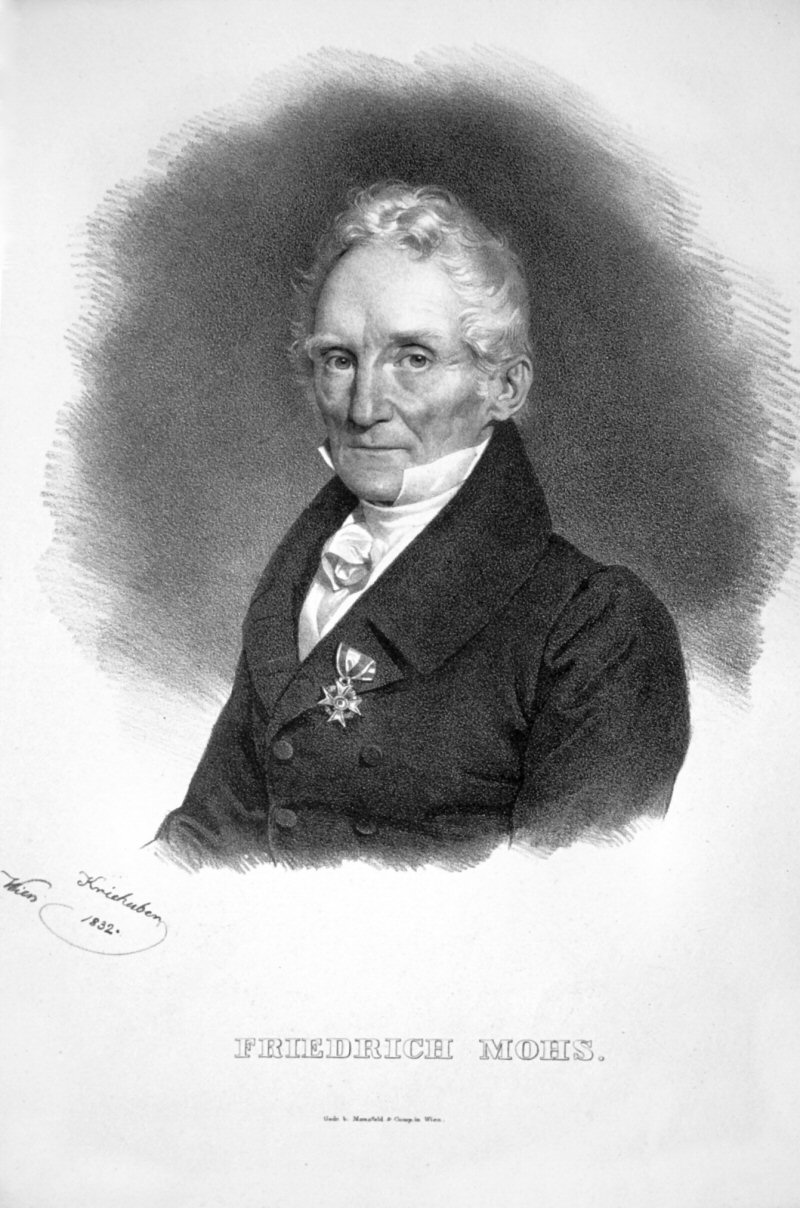
Friedrich Mohs

- July 1 – Mahmud II, Ottoman sultan (b. 1785)
- July 5 – Lady Flora Hastings, British aristocrat and lady-in-waiting (b. 1806)
- July 8 – Fernando Sor, Spanish guitarist, composer (b. 1778)
- July 15 – Winthrop Mackworth Praed, English politician, poet (b. 1802)
- July 16 – Chief Bowles, Cherokee leader (b. ~1756)
- July 19 – Maurice de Guérin, French poet (b. 1810)
- July 20 – John Baptist Yi Kwang-nyol, Korean Martyr (b. c.1800)
- July 22 – John Birdsall, American lawyer and politician (b. 1802)
- July 24 – Richard Spencer, captain of the Royal Navy (b. 1779)
- July 26 – Mervyn Archdall, Irish officer in the British Army and MP for County Fermanagh (b. 1763)
- August 3 – Dorothea von Schlegel, German novelist and translator (b. 1764)
- August 7 – Erasme Louis Surlet de Chokier, politician and first regent of Belgium (b. 1769)
- August 10 – Sir John St Aubyn, 5th Baronet, English fossil collector (b. 1758)
- August 18 – Bendix Frantz Ludwig Schow, member of the nobility of Schleswig-Holstein (b. 1778)
- August 22 – Benjamin Lundy, American abolitionist (b. 1789)
- August 28 – William Smith, English geologist, cartographer (b. 1769)
- September 4 – Hermann Olshausen, German theologian (b. 1796)
- September 10 – James Maitland, 8th Earl of Lauderdale, Scottish politician (b. 1759)
- September 18 – Jeanne-Charlotte Allamand, Swiss-born Canadian pioneer, educator and artist (b. 1760)
- September 21 – Laurent-Joseph-Marius Imbert, French Roman Catholic saint (b. 1796)
- September 22 – Paul Chong Hasang, Korean Roman Catholic saint and martyr (b. 1794/1795)
- September 28 – William Dunlap, producer, playwright, actor, and historian (b. 1766)
- September 29 – Friedrich Mohs, German geologist, mineralogist (b. 1773)
- October 2 – Mary Ann Rundall, British educational writer
- October 6 – William Light, British Army colonel, first Surveyor-General of South Australia (b. 1786)
- October 8 – Ee-mat-la, Seminole chief during the Second Seminole War (b. 1739)
- October 9 – James Oatley, British-born colonial Australian watch and clock maker (b. 1769)
- October 11 – Leonor de Almeida Portugal, 4th Marquise of Alorna, Portuguese painter, poet (b. 1750)
- October 24 – William Charles Ellis, pioneer in treatment of mental illness (b. 1780)
- October 27 – Frederik Hauch, Danish government official (b. 1754)
- October 28 – Makea Pori Ariki, sovereign of the Cook Islands and one of three High Chiefs of Te Au O Tonga (b.
- October 31 – Peter Yu Tae-cholm, Korean Martyr (b. 1826)
- November 15 – William Murdoch, Scottish inventor (b. 1754)
- November 18 – Hans Blackwood, Irish peer and politician (b. 1758)
- November 22 – Vénérande Robichaud, Canadian businesswoman (b. 1753)
- December 2 – Andreas Landmark, Norwegian politician and civil servant (b. 1769)
- December 3 – Frederick VI, King of Denmark, ex-King of Norway (b. 1768)
- December 4 – John Leamy, Irish–American merchant (b. 1757)
- December 15 – Ignaz Aurelius Fessler, Hungarian court councillor, minister to Alexander I (b. 1756)
- December 21 – Andrew Dũng-Lạc, Vietnamese Roman Catholic priest, saint, and martyr (b. 1795)
- December 26 – Laurent Jean François Truguet, French admiral (b. 1752)

=== Date unknown ===
- Thomas Plunket, Irish soldier (b. 1785)
- Walter Jones, Irish politician (b. 1754)
- Pierre le Pelley III, Seigneur of Sark from 1820 to 1839 (b. 1799)
- George Scholey, banker who served as Lord Mayor of London
- Otto Christian von Rohr, Prussian army officer during the Napoleonic Wars
- John D'Arcy, founder of the town of Clifden (b. 1785)
- Jean-François Allard, French soldier and adventurer (b. 1785)
- Edmund Lodge, English officer of arms and a writer on heraldic subjects and short biographies (b. 1756)
- Sankara Varman, astronomer-mathematician (b. 1774)
- William Francklin, English orientalist and army officer (b. 1763)
- Mattheus Ignatius van Bree, Belgian painter (b. 1773)
