= 1838 =

1838 in various calendars
- Gregorian calendar: 1838; MDCCCXXXVIII
- Ab urbe condita: 2591
- Armenian calendar: 1287; ԹՎ ՌՄՁԷ
- Assyrian calendar: 6588
- Balinese saka calendar: 1759–1760
- Bengali calendar: 1244–1245
- Berber calendar: 2788
- British Regnal year: 1 Vict. 1 – 2 Vict. 1
- Buddhist calendar: 2382
- Burmese calendar: 1200
- Byzantine calendar: 7346–7347
- Chinese calendar: 丁酉年 (Fire Rooster); 4535 or 4328 — to — 戊戌年 (Earth Dog); 4536 or 4329
- Coptic calendar: 1554–1555
- Discordian calendar: 3004
- Ethiopian calendar: 1830–1831
- Hebrew calendar: 5598–5599
- Hindu calendars
- Vikram Samvat: 1894–1895
- Shaka Samvat: 1759–1760
- Kali Yuga: 4938–4939
- Holocene calendar: 11838
- Igbo calendar: 838–839
- Iranian calendar: 1216–1217
- Islamic calendar: 1253–1254
- Japanese calendar: Tenpō 9 (天保９年)
- Javanese calendar: 1765–1766
- Julian calendar: Gregorian minus 12 days
- Korean calendar: 4171
- Minguo calendar: 74 before ROC 民前74年
- Nanakshahi calendar: 370
- Thai solar calendar: 2380–2381
- Tibetan calendar: མེ་མོ་བྱ་ལོ་ (female Fire-Bird); 1964 or 1583 or 811 — to — ས་ཕོ་ཁྱི་ལོ་ (male Earth-Dog); 1965 or 1584 or 812

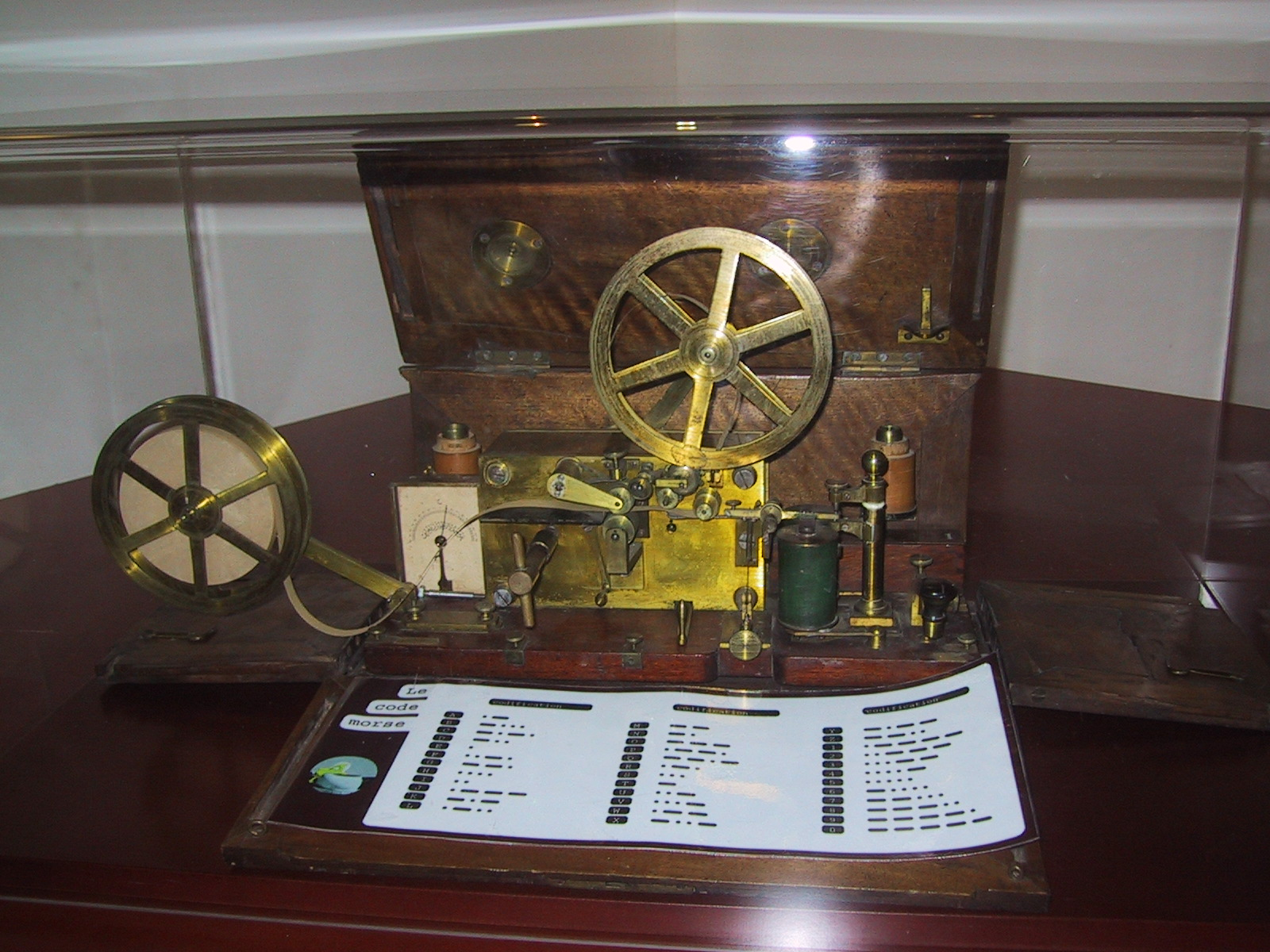
January 11: The Morse telegraph is first demonstrated in the U.S.

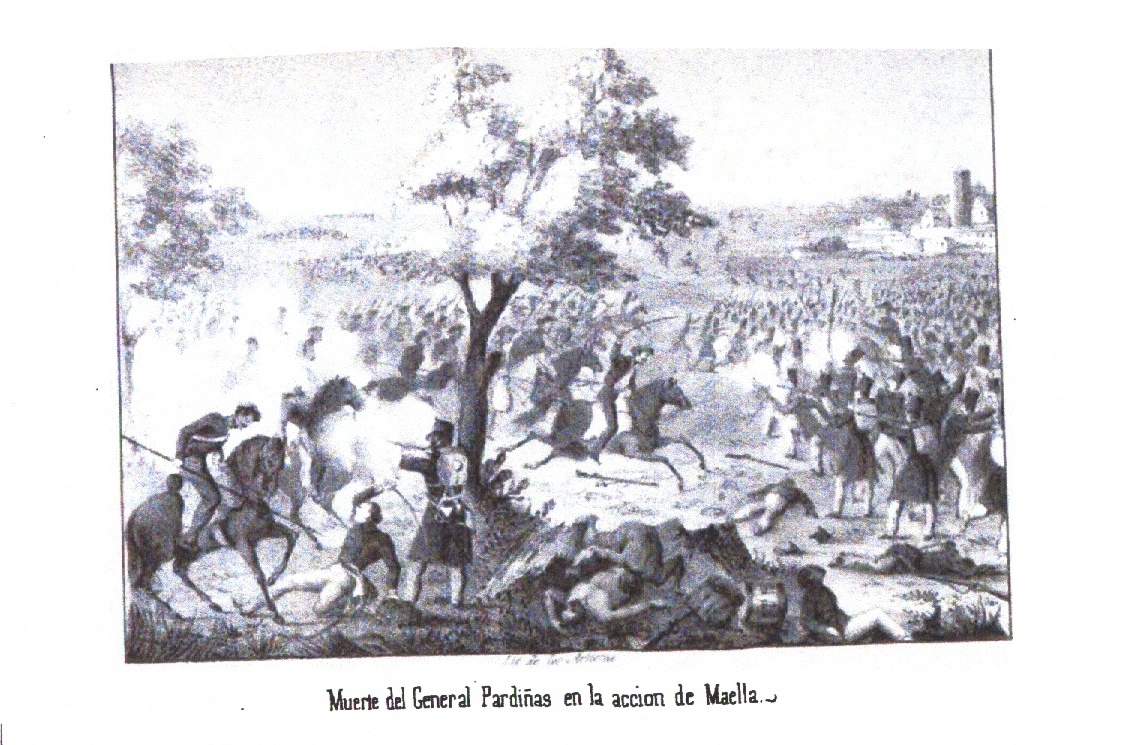
October 1: Battle of Maella

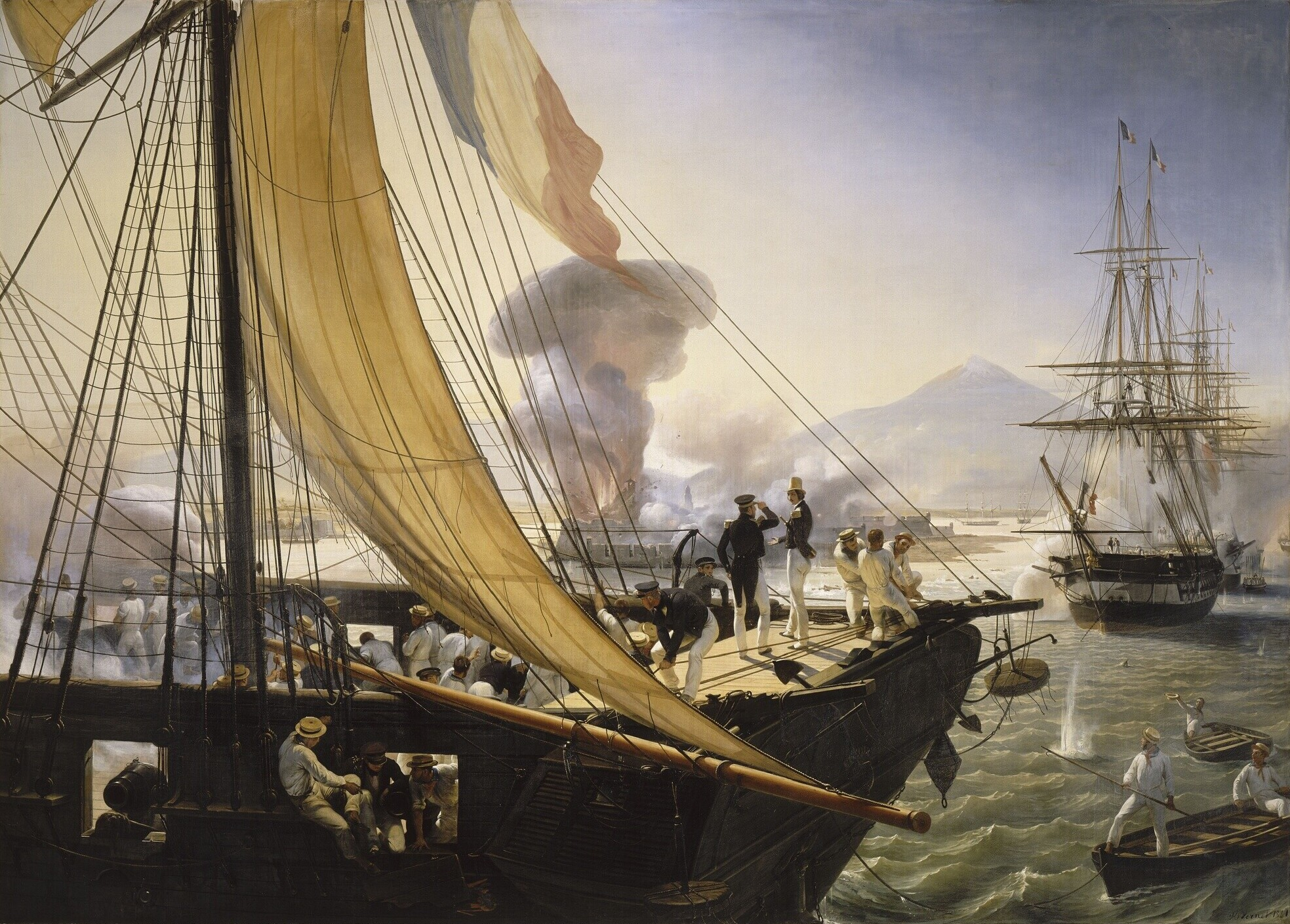
November 27: Start of the First French intervention in Mexico

1838 (MDCCCXXXVIII) was a common year starting on Monday of the Gregorian calendar and a common year starting on Saturday of the Julian calendar, the 1838th year of the Common Era (CE) and Anno Domini (AD) designations, the 838th year of the 2nd millennium, the 38th year of the 19th century, and the 9th year of the 1830s decade. As of the start of 1838, the Gregorian calendar was 12 days ahead of the Julian calendar, which remained in localized use until 1923.

== Events ==
=== January–March ===
- January 10 – A fire destroys Lloyd's Coffee House and the Royal Exchange in London.
- January 11 – At Morristown, New Jersey, Samuel Morse, Alfred Vail and Leonard Gale give the first public demonstration of Morse's new invention, the telegraph.
- January 21 – The first known report about the lowest temperature on Earth is made, indicating −60 °C (−76 °F) in Yakutsk.
- January 23 – A 7.5 earthquake strikes the Romanian district of Vrancea causing damage in Moldavia and Wallachia, killing 73 people.
- February 6 – Boer explorer Piet Retief and 60 of his men are massacred by King Dingane kaSenzangakhona of the Zulu people, after Retief accepts an invitation to celebrate the signing of a treaty, and his men willingly disarm as a show of good faith.
- February 17 – Weenen massacre: Zulu impis massacre about 532 Voortrekkers, Khoikhoi and Basuto around the site of Weenen in South Africa.
- February 24 – U.S. Representatives William J. Graves of Kentucky and Jonathan Cilley of Maine face each other in a duel with rifles at 80 yards near Bladensburg, Maryland. On the third attempt, Congressman Cilley is fatally wounded and bleeds to death.
- March 13 – A combination of rain and melting snow causes the Danube River to overflow its banks, washing away villages in western Hungary and inundating the twin cities that become Budapest. More than 150 people are drowned and Europe's nations come to Hungary's aid to prevent the spread of famine and disease.
- March 31 – The first installment of Nicholas Nickleby, the new novel by Charles Dickens, is released as the opener of a 20-part serialization in London.

=== April–June ===
- April 4–22 – The paddle steamer SS Sirius makes the transatlantic crossing to New York from Cork, Ireland in 18 days, though not using steam continuously.
- April 8–23 – Isambard Kingdom Brunel's paddle steamer SS Great Western (1838) makes the transatlantic crossing to New York from Avonmouth, England, in 15 days, inaugurating a regular steamship service.
- April 30 – Nicaragua declares independence from the Federal Republic of Central America.
- May
  - The People's Charter is drawn up in the United Kingdom, demanding universal suffrage.
  - Lord Durham and his entourage arrive in Upper Canada, to investigate the cause of the 1837 rebellion in that province. This leads to Durham submitting the Durham Report to Britain.
  - An insurrection breaks out in Tizimín, beginning the campaign for the independence of Yucatán from Mexico.
- May 26 – Trail of Tears: The Cherokee Nation is forcibly relocated in the United States.
- May 28 – Braulio Carrillo is sworn in as Head of State of Costa Rica, thus beginning his second term in office.
- June 10 – Myall Creek massacre: 28 Indigenous Australians are killed.
- June 28 – The coronation of Queen Victoria of the United Kingdom takes place at Westminster Abbey in London.

=== July–September ===
- July 4 – In the United States, the Iowa Territory is formally established, following the signing of a bill by President Martin Van Buren on June 12. In addition to Iowa, which will become a state on December 28, 1846, the Territory also includes most of what will become the states of Minnesota, North Dakota and South Dakota. Robert Lucas, former Governor of Ohio, takes office as the first Territorial Governor.
- August 1 – Most former slaves in the British Empire are released from apprenticeships, giving them full emancipation under terms of the Slavery Abolition Act 1833.
- August 6 – The Polytechnic Institution, predecessor of the University of Westminster and Britain's first polytechnic, opens in Regent Street, London.
- September 7 – Grace Darling and her father rescue 13 survivors from the Forfarshire, off the Farne Islands.
- September 18 – The Anti-Corn Law League is established in Britain by Richard Cobden.

=== October–December ===
- October 1 – First Carlist War – Battle of Maella: Supporters of Infante Carlos María Isidro of Spain are victorious.
- October 5 – Killough massacre, believed to be both the largest and last Native American attack on white settlers in East Texas. 18 casualties are either killed or carried away.
- October 27 – Lilburn Boggs, Governor of Missouri, by Missouri Executive Order 44, declares Mormons to be enemies of the state, and encourages the extermination or exile of the religious minority, forcing nearly 10,000 Mormons out of the state. It was later rescinded in 1976.
- November 3 – The Bombay Times and Journal of Commerce is founded (renamed The Times of India in 1861).
- November 5 – Dissolution of the Federal Republic of Central America: Honduras and Costa Rica follow the example of Nicaragua and secede from the federation.
- November 16 – Austria: Moravia opens the final section of Emperor Ferdinand Northern Railway (Rajhrad–Brno) for exhibition (preliminary) use.
- November 27 – Pastry War: Mexico is invaded by French forces.
- December 16 – Battle of Blood River: The Boers win a decisive victory over the Zulus.
- December – First Anglo-Afghan War: British and Presidency armies set out from Punjab in support of Shah Shujah Durrani's claim to the throne of Afghanistan.

=== Date unknown ===
- The Pitcairn Islands become a Crown colony of the United Kingdom, and women there are the first in the world to be granted and maintain women's suffrage.
- Sylvain Charles Valée founds Skikda, Algeria.
- Proteins are discovered by Gerardus Johannes Mulder. and named by Jöns Jacob Berzelius.
- Friedrich Bessel makes the first accurate measurement of distance to a star.
- Biblical criticism: Christian Hermann Weisse proposes the two-source hypothesis.
- Duke University is established in North Carolina.
- The 5th century BC bronze Chatsworth Head is acquired by the 6th Duke of Devonshire at Smyrna, from H. P. Borrell.

== Births ==
=== January–March ===
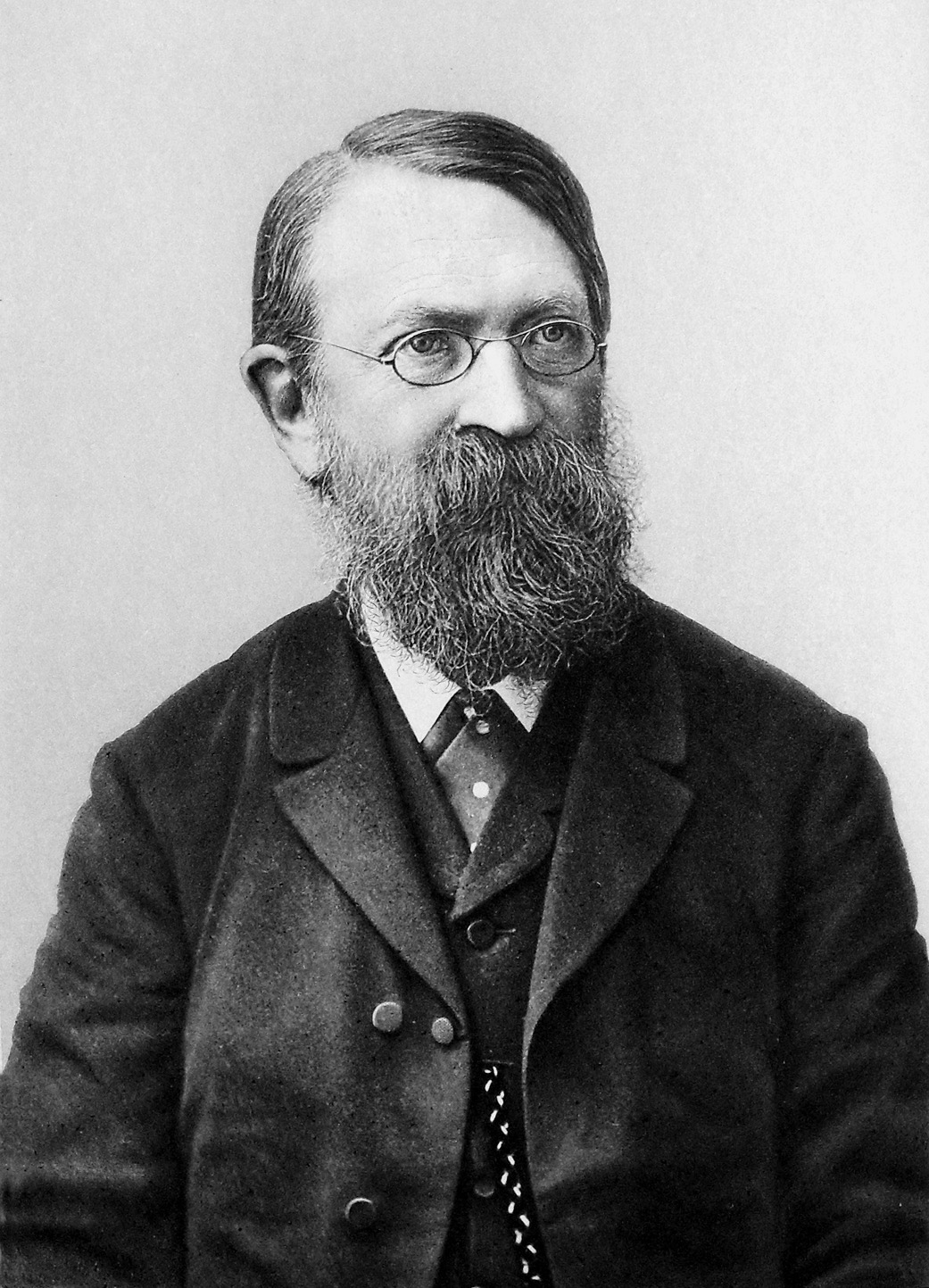
Ernst Mach

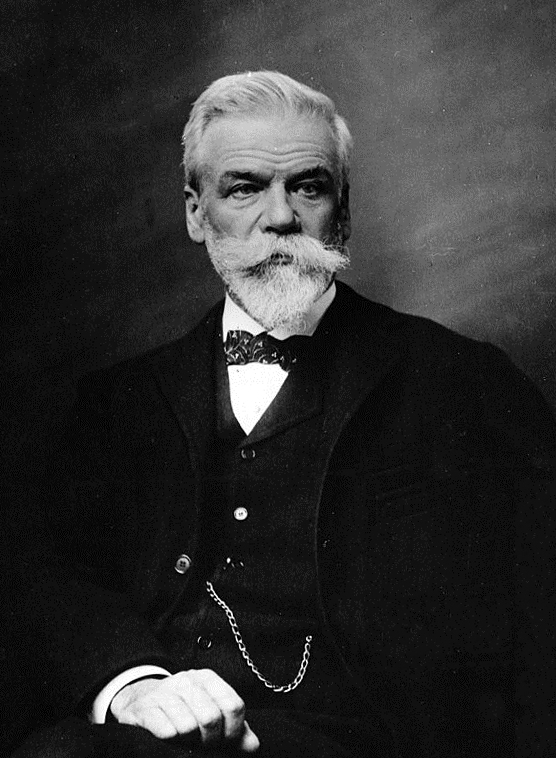
Ernest Solvay

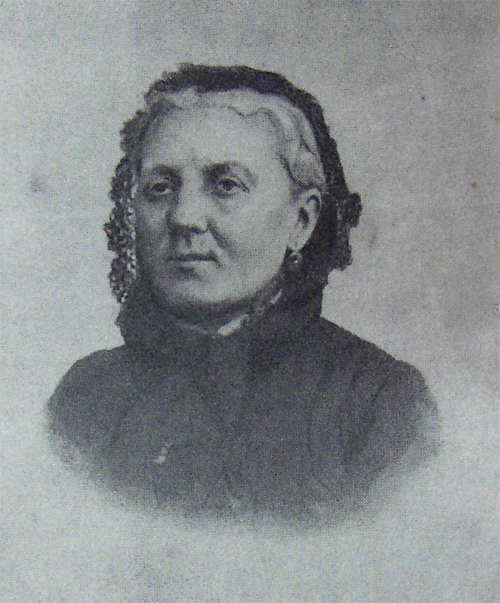
Isabelle Bogelot

- January 4 – General Tom Thumb, American circus performer, entertainer (d. 1883)
- January 6
  - Anton Berindei, Wallachian-born Romanian general and politician (d. 1899)
  - Max Bruch, German composer (d. 1920)
- January 16 – Franz Brentano, German philosopher, psychologist (d. 1917)
- January 29 – Edward W. Morley, American chemist noted for working on the Michelson–Morley experiment (d. 1923)
- February 2 – John Joseph Jolly Kyle, Scots-born Argentine chemist (d. 1922)
- February 6 – Sir Henry Irving, English actor (d. 1905)
- February 9 – Sir Evelyn Wood, British field marshal, Victoria Cross recipient (d. 1919)
- February 12 – Julius Dresser, American writer (d. 1893)
- February 13 – Annetta Seabury Dresser, American writer (d. 1893)
- February 16 – Henry Brooks Adams, American historian (d. 1918)
- February 18 – Ernst Mach, Austrian physicist, philosopher (d. 1916)
- March 3 – George William Hill, American astronomer (d. 1914)
- March 11 – Ōkuma Shigenobu, Japanese politician (d. 1922)
- March 12 – Sir William Perkin, English chemist (d. 1907)
- March 15 – Alice Cunningham Fletcher, American ethnologist, anthropologist, and social scientist (d. 1923)

=== April–June ===
- April 2 – Léon Gambetta, 37th Prime Minister of France (d. 1882)
- April 3 – John Willis Menard, African-American politician (d. 1893)
- April 12 – John Shaw Billings, American military and medical leader (d. 1913)
- April 16
  - Ernest Solvay, Belgian chemist, industrialist and philanthropist (d. 1922)
  - Martha McClellan Brown, American temperance movement leader (d. 1916)
- April 18 – Paul-Émile Lecoq de Boisbaudran, French chemist (d. 1912)
- April 21 – John Muir, American ecologist (d. 1914)
- April 28 – Tobias Asser, Dutch jurist, recipient of the Nobel Peace Prize (d. 1913)
- May 10 – John Wilkes Booth, American actor, assassin of Abraham Lincoln (d. 1865)
- May 11 – Isabelle Bogelot, French philanthropist (d. 1923)
- May 20 – Jules Méline, French statesman (d. 1925)
- June 14 – Yamagata Aritomo, Japanese field marshal, Prime Minister (d. 1922)
- June 19 – Mary Cole Walling, American patriot, lecturer (d. 1925)
- June 24 – Gustav von Schmoller, German economist (d. 1917)
- June 27 – Bankim Chandra Chatterjee, Indian author (d. 1894)

=== July–September ===
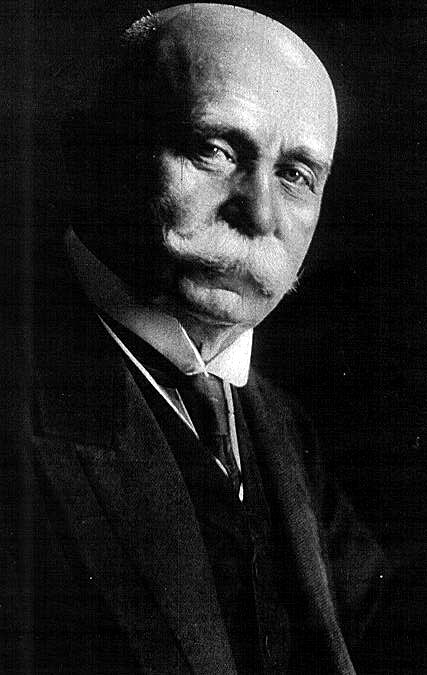
Ferdinand von Zeppelin

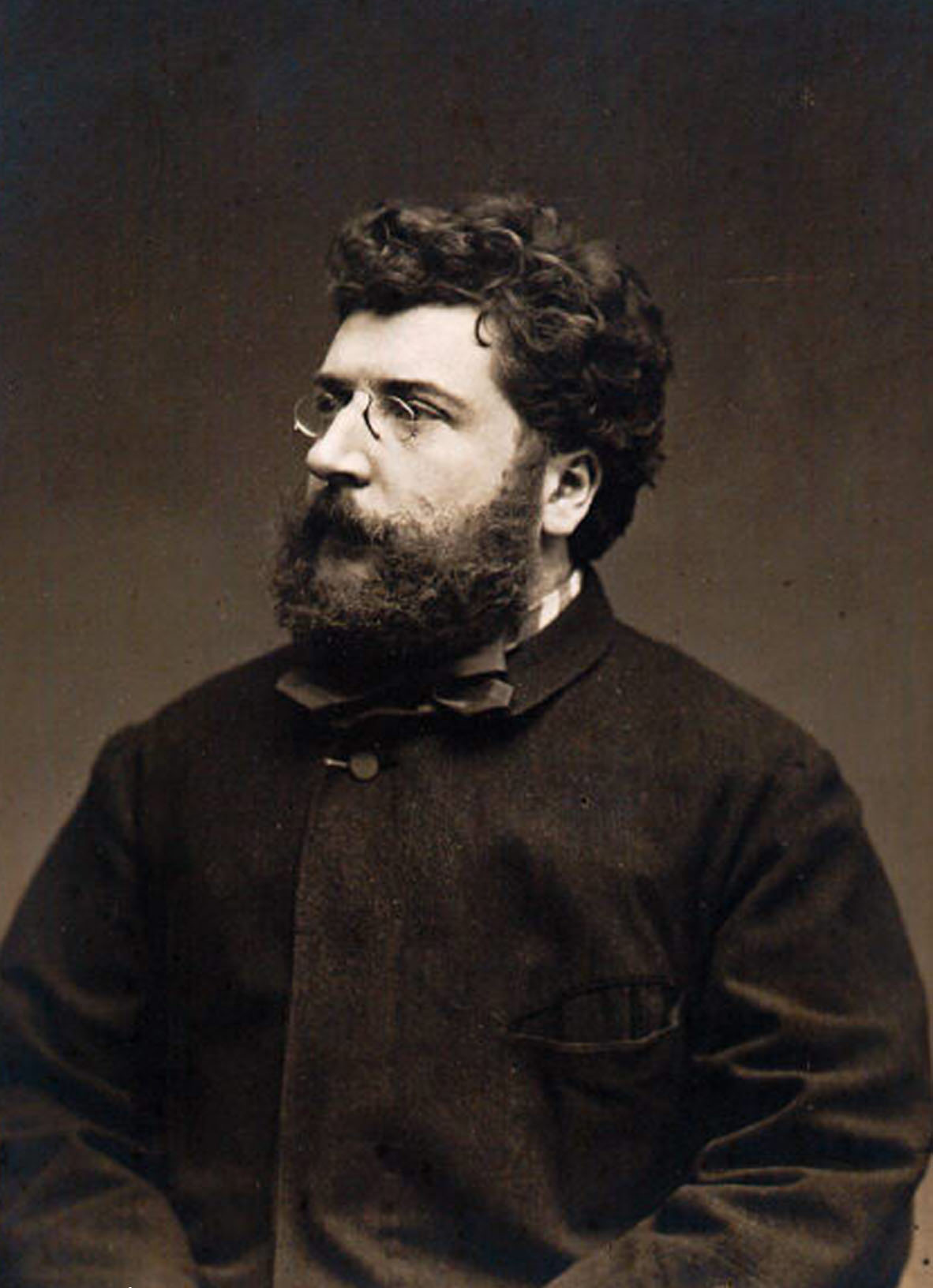
Georges Bizet

- July full date unknown – Bass Reeves, one of the first black Deputy U.S. Marshals west of the Mississippi River (d. 1910)
- July 1 – Marie-Louise Jaÿ, French businesswoman (d. 1925)
- July 5 – Vatroslav Jagić, Croatian scholar (d. 1923)
- July 7 – Felice Napoleone Canevaro, Italian admiral (d. 1926)
- July 8 – Ferdinand von Zeppelin, German military officer, founder of the Zeppelin Company (d. 1917)
- July 11 – John Wanamaker, American merchant and religious, civic and political figure (d. 1922)
- July 20 – Sir George Trevelyan, 2nd Baronet, British statesman, author (d. 1928)
- September 2
  - Bhaktivinoda Thakur, Indian guru, philosopher (d. 1914)
  - Liliuokalani, last Queen of Hawaii (d. 1917)
- September 17 – Valeriano Weyler, Spanish general (d. 1930)
- September 21
  - Constantin Budișteanu (birth also reported as November 4), Wallachian-born Romanian soldier and politician (d. 1911)
  - Victoria Woodhull, American woman's suffrage leader; first woman to run for U.S. President (d. 1927)
- September 27 – Lawrence Sullivan Ross, Confederate brigadier general, Texas governor and president of Texas A&M University (d. 1898)
- September 28 – Sai Baba, Indian spiritual master and National saint (d. 1918)
- September 29 – Henry Hobson Richardson, American architect (d. 1886)
- September 30 – Phoebe Jane Babcock Wait, American physician (d. 1904)

=== October–December ===
- October 6 – Giuseppe Cesare Abba, Italian patriot, writer (d. 1910)
- October 8 – John Hay, diplomat, private secretary to Abraham Lincoln, 37th United States Secretary of State (d. 1905)
- October 25 – Georges Bizet, French composer (d. 1875)
- October 31 – King Luís I of Portugal (d. 1889)
- November 1 – Khedrup Gyatso, 11th Dalai Lama (d. 1856)
- November 4 – Constantin Budișteanu (birth also reported as September 21), Wallachian-born Romanian soldier and politician (d. 1911)
- November 7 – Auguste Villiers de l'Isle-Adam, French writer (d. 1889)
- November 8 – Rufus W. Peckham, Associate Justice of the Supreme Court of the United States (d. 1909)
- November 13 – Joseph F. Smith, 6th president of the Church of Jesus Christ of Latter-day Saints (d. 1918)
- November 17 – Sir Lambton Loraine, 11th Baronet, British naval officer (d. 1917)
- November 20 – Hedvig Raa-Winterhjelm, pioneer Scandinavian actor (d. 1907)
- November 23 – Stephanos Skouloudis, 34th Prime Minister of Greece (d. 1928)
- November 29 – Giovanni Losi, Italian Combonian missionary (d. 1882)
- December 3 – Cleveland Abbe, American meteorologist (d. 1916)
- December 3 – Octavia Hill, British social reformer (d. 1912)
- December 19 – Darinka Petrovic, Princess consort of Montenegro (d. 1892)
- December 20 – Edwin Abbott Abbott, English theologian, author (d. 1926)
- December 30 – Émile Loubet, 8th President of France (d. 1929)

=== Date unknown ===
- Jamāl al-Dīn al-Afghānī, Islamic teacher, writer (d. 1897)
- Bass Reeves, American lawman and first black deputy U.S. marshall (d. 1910)

== Deaths ==
=== January–June ===
- January 3 – Maximilian, Hereditary Prince of Saxony (b. 1759)
- January 5 – Anthony Van Egmond, leader in Upper Canada Rebellion of 1837 (d. in jail) (b. 1778)
- January 12 – Joshua Humphreys, American naval architect (b. 1751)
- January 13 – John Scott, 1st Earl of Eldon, Lord Chancellor of Great Britain (b. 1751)
- February 21 – Silvestre de Sacy, French linguist (b. 1758)
- February 24 – Christoph Johann von Medem, German courtier (b. 1763)
- March 7 – Robert Townsend (spy), American member of the Culper Spy Ring (b. 1753)
- March 13 – Poul Martin Møller, Danish philosopher (b. 1794)
- March 16 – Nathaniel Bowditch, American mathematician (b. 1773)
- March 23 – Michael Anckarsvärd, Swedish politician (b. 1742)
- April 3 – François Carlo Antommarchi, French physician (b. 1780)
- April 6 – José Bonifácio de Andrada e Silva, Brazilian statesman, naturalist (b. 1763)
- April 9 – Piet Uys, Voortrekker leader (in battle) (b. 1797)
- May – Francisco Gómez, President of El Salvador (b. 1796)
- May 17 – Charles Maurice de Talleyrand-Périgord, French politician (b. 1754)
- May 19 – Sir Richard Hoare, English archaeologist (b. 1758)
- May 23 – Jan Willem Janssens, Governor-General of the Dutch East Indies (b. 1762)
- June 4 – Thomas Hancorne, Welsh Anglican clergyman and judicial officer (b. 1752)
- June 14 – Maximilian von Montgelas, Bavarian statesman (b. 1759)

=== July–December ===
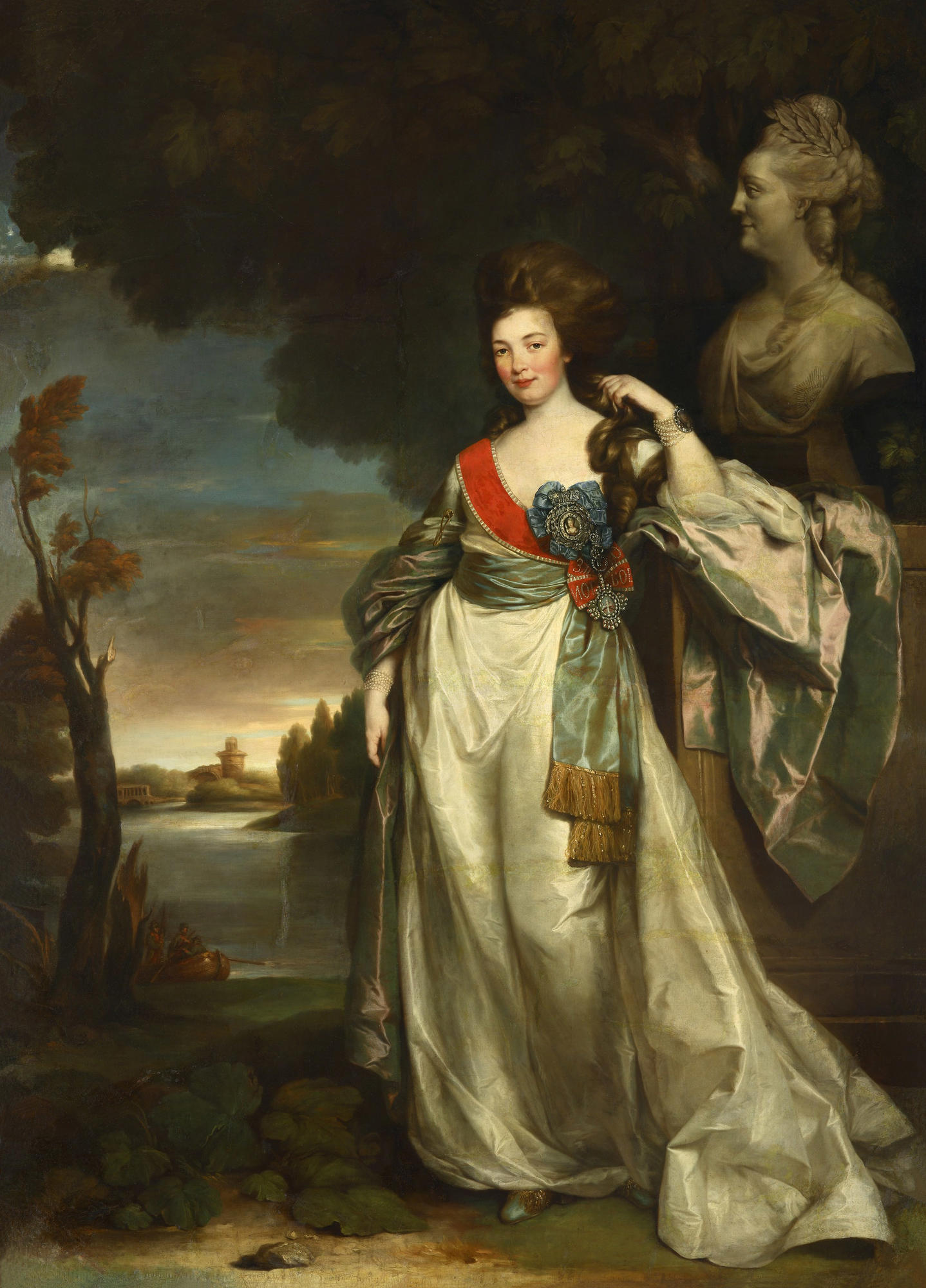
Alexandra Branitskaya

- July 19 – Christmas Evans, Welsh preacher (b. 1766)
- August 1 – John Rodgers, American naval officer (b. 1772)
- August 17 – Lorenzo Da Ponte, librettist for Mozart (b. 1n writer (b. 1781)
- September 1 – William Clark, American explorer (b. 1770)
- September 15 – Alexandra Branitskaya, Russian political activist, courtier and businessperson (b. 1754)
- September 18 – Robert Smith, 1st Baron Carrington (b. 1752)
- September 27 – Bernard Courtois, French chemist (b. 1777)
- October 1 – Charles Tennant, Scottish chemist, industrialist (b. 1768)
- October 3 – Black Hawk, Sauk Indian chief, autobiographer (b. 1767)
- October 5 – Pauline Léon, French feminist, radical (b. 1768)
- November 7 – Anne Grant, Scottish poet (b. 1755)
- November 21 – Georges Mouton, count of Lobau, Marshal of France (b. 1770)
- December 12 – Elisha Clark, American politician (b. 1752)
- December 20 – Hégésippe Moreau, French writer and poet (b. 1810)
