= Dresser =

Dresser may refer to:

== Furniture ==
- A chest of drawers in a bedroom
- A dressing table
- A Welsh dresser (often called a "china hutch" in the United States), used to store and display crockery and cutlery in a kitchen, scullery or dining room

== Film and theater ==
- Dresser (theatre), theatrical stagehand involved with costumes
- The Dresser, a 1980 play by Ronald Harwood
  - The Dresser (1983 film), a film adaptation of the play starring Albert Finney and Tom Courtenay
  - The Dresser (2015 film), a TV adaptation of the play starring Anthony Hopkins and Ian McKellen
- Hamlet's Dresser, a memoir by Bob Smith about his experiences as a dresser

== Places ==
- Dresser, California, community in Alameda County
- Dresser, Indiana, a ghost town in Vigo County
- Dresser, Wisconsin, small town in Polk County, Wisconsin
- Dresser (CDP), Indiana
- Dresser Island
- Dresser Tower

== Others ==
- Dresser (surname)
- Dresser Industries, multinational corporation based in Dallas, Texas
- Full-dresser, a large touring motorcycle with panniers, topbox and fairing
- Grinding dresser, a tool to dress the surface of a grinding wheel
- Set dresser in media or theater, responsible for preparing the set with props and furniture
- Window dresser, shop display designer

== See also ==
- The Dresser (disambiguation)
- Dress (disambiguation)
