= Dresser (surname) =

Dresser is a surname. Notable people with the surname include:

- Annetta Seabury Dresser (1843–1935), American writer
- Bob Dresser (1878–1924), American baseball player
- Christopher Dresser (1834–1904), Scottish designer and design theorist, a pivotal figure in the Aesthetic Movement
- Daniel LeRoy Dresser (1862–1915), American shipbuilder
- Davis Dresser
- Denise Dresser (born 1963), Mexican political analyst, writer, and university professor
- Edith Stuyvesant Dresser (1873–1958), American philanthropist and wife of George Washington Vanderbilt II and Peter Goelet Gerry
- George Warren Dresser (1837–1883), American soldier and civil engineer
- Henry Dresser (1891–1963), American football and baseball player and coach.
- Henry Eeles Dresser (1838–1915), English businessman and ornithologist
- Hilary Dresser (born 1968), British sprint canoeist
- Horatio Dresser (1866–1954), American, New Thought religious leader and author
- Ivan Dresser (1896–1956), American runner in the 1920 Olympics
- Jeff Dresser (born 1973), retired American soccer midfielder
- Julius Dresser (1838–1893), American, early leader in the New Thought movement
- Kevin Dresser (born 1962), American wrestling coach
- Louisa Dresser (1907–1989), expert on early American painting
- Louise Dresser (1878–1965), American actress
- Madge Dresser, professor
- Marcia Van Dresser (1877–1937), American operatic soprano, recitalist, and actress
- Mark Dresser (born 1952), American double bass player and composer
- Paul Dresser (1857–1906), American singer, songwriter and comedic actor
- Richard Dresser (born c.1951), American playwright
- Samuel Dresser (1831–1901), American politician
- Solomon Robert Dresser (1842–1911), American inventor and politician
- Tom Dresser (1892–1982), English soldier, recipient of the Victoria Cross
