= Warren Felt Evans =

American writer

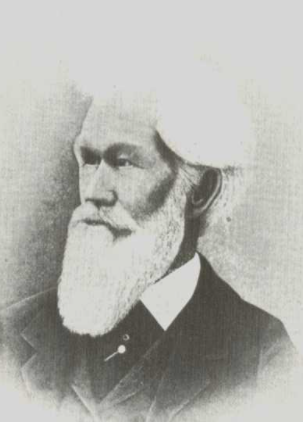
- Born: December 23, 1817; Rockingham, Vermont, US
- Died: September 4, 1889 (aged 71); Salisbury, Massachusetts, US
- Other names: W. F. Evans
- Occupations: Philosopher, author
- Known for: First author of the New Thought movement

Warren Felt Evans (December 23, 1817 – September 4, 1889) was an American author connected with the New Thought movement. A former Methodist turned Swedenborian, he was the founder of a mind-cure sanitarium in Salisbury, Massachusetts, and was referred to as "the recording angel of metaphysics" by Charles Fillmore, the co-founder of Unity Church.

== Life ==
Born in Rockingham, Vermont, Evans was the sixth of seven children of Eli and Sarah Evans. He had an apparently happy childhood and was a Congregationalist before becoming a Methodist. After studying at Chester Academy he entered Middlebury College in 1837, transferring the next year to Dartmouth College. However, he left in the middle of his junior year for unclear reasons, possibly in order to enter the ministry more quickly or possibly for personal or financial reasons. He married M. Charlotte Tinker two years afterwards in 1840.

Evans became a Methodist lay minister in 1839, and was ordained in 1844, serving eleven different charges until 1863. That year he left the Methodists and joined the Church of the New Jerusalem after reading the books of Emanuel Swedenborg. About 1840, if not earlier, Evans became a convert to the idealism of Irish philosopher, Bishop George Berkeley (1685-1753), interestingly due to an attack upon Berkeley’s philosophy by Thomas Reid (1710-1796), Scottish philosopher from Glasgow who represented the philosophical “Scottish School” of “common sense” realism. This challenge by Reid took place long before Evans was born, and it is likely that he learned of it during his college years. In his book, Divine Law of Cure (1881), p. 154, he wrote: “Reid’s attempt to refute Berkeley made me a convert to idealism more than two score years ago.”

While still in the Methodist church, Evans wrote on April 12, 1860 in his journal, after being elected delegate to the General Conference for next year, of his view of the Christian faith as a healer and the impact of the human mind on disease: “The Lord is my strength. He is the health of my countenance and my God. I will find in Christ all that I need. He can cure every form of mental disease, and thus restore the body; for disease originates generally, if not always, in mind. I lay hold of Jesus as my life & salvation.”

Around the same time Evans converted to the Swedenborgian church, he visited Phineas Parkhurst Quimby twice for help with persistent health problems, but his journals make no mention of Quimby, and his illness continued unabated for some time after the visits.

Evans continued preaching Swedenborgianism and distributing the church's literature as a colporteur, and eventually opened a mental medicine office in Claremont, New Hampshire with his wife, and later opened an office in Boston, as well as taking patients at their home in Salisbury, Massachusetts. They practiced and informally taught the principles of mental healing there for 20 years. In his journal, Evans stated that he had gotten the idea of mental healing from his study of Swedenborg.

According to Catherine L. Albanese, "Evans brought his initial ideas on the power of mind into touch with new ones from a liberal community of seekers, often disaffected with orthodox Christianity and turning, in combinative ways, toward Asian philosophies and religions as well as the mystical heritage of Europe." In addition to Swedenborg and Eastern religions and philosophy, Evans himself was influenced by Kabbalah literature, mysticism, modern science, esotericism, and theosophy.

Evans was one of the many influences on Charles Fillmore of Unity Church, who called him "the recording angel of metaphysics". Charles S. Braden, a metaphysical historian, wrote that Evans, "was the only important figure, aside from Mrs. Eddy, who attempted to work out a consistent and philosophically supported system of metaphysical healing and mental healing after Quimby." Unlike Eddy however, Evans was never accused of stealing Quimby's ideas.

Evan's disagreed with Quimby's ideas including that spirit was "etheralized matter." According to J. Gordon Melton, Swedenborg's teachings, rather than Quimby's, dominated Evan's writing, to the point that "he abandoned Quimby altogether and became the conduit of Swedenborgian thought, his variation of it being termed Christian pantheism".

Evans died on September 4, 1889. His wife and three of their at least four children survived him.

== Relation to Quimby ==
It has been traditionally thought that he became a student of the New Thought movement in 1863, after seeking healing from its founder, Phineas Parkhurst Quimby, but recent scholarship by Catherine Albanese, editor of The Spiritual Journals of Warren Felt Evans from Methodism to Mind Cure, puts that in serious doubt—based on interviews that Evans gave, his own printed statements, and his personal journal during this period which never mentioned Quimby. For example in an interview with A. J. Swarts in Mental Science Magazine (March, 1888), Swarts reported Evans had "called twice briefly on Dr. Q. in Portland nearly twenty-five years ago, and his interviews satisfied him that his own methods of cure were like those which Dr. Q employed." Swarts added that Evans spoke "well of him [Quimby], and of all the workers, simply desiring all to be honest and to 'give credit where credit is due.’"

Swarts reported in the same issue: “He told me recently that he was passing through Portland near twenty-five years ago; that he called upon Dr. Quimby in the United States Hotel to ascertain his methods of treatment, and that he found them to be like those he had employed for several years, which was a mental process of changing the patient’s way of thinking about disease. He said that Dr. Quimby would manipulate the head sometimes.”

Evans in his book (1869) The Mental-Cure, p. iv, made clear his view of lack of antecedents or mentors: ““The author had but little in works on mental and psychological science to guide him in his investigations, but was under the necessity of following the light of his own researches, experiments, and intuitions.”

This compares to what Julius Dresser, who was the first to claim Evans got his ideas from Quimby, said in The True History of Mental Science (1887), looking back eleven years:

“Dr. Evans obtained this knowledge of Quimby mainly when he visited him as a patient, making two visits for that purpose, about the year 1863, an interesting account of which I received from him, at East Salisbury, in the year 1876. Dr. Evans had been a clergyman up to the year 1863, and was then located in Claremont, N. H. But so readily did he understand the explanations of Quimby, which his Swedenborgian faith enabled him to grasp the more quickly, that he told Quimby at the second interview that he thought he could himself cure the sick in this way. Quimby replied that he thought he could. His first attempts on returning home were so successful that the preacher became a practitioner from that time, and the result has been great growth in the truth and the accomplishment of a great and a good work during the nearly twenty-five years since then. Dr. Evans's six volumes upon the subject of Mental Healing have had a wide and a well-deserved sale.”

Evans looked back to about the year 1860 when he wrote this in his article “The Mental-Cure” in the periodical The Mind Cure and the Science of Life (May, 1885):

“The system of mental healing which is now exciting so much interest in the public mind is not a new system, but under other names has been practiced from the remotest ages. . . .This is not a new revelation, but is the old philosophic idealism, the most ancient and the most spiritual philosophy of mankind. The best exposition of this philosophy in modern times is found in the works of such men as Bishop Berkeley, and the German idealists,, as Fichte, Hegel, and Schopenhauer. But the fundamental truths and practical principles involved in the cure of ourselves or others by the phrenopathic method are extremely simple, and can be learned in a short time. . . . During the last twenty-five years I have taught all that is of any practical value in the systems to hundreds of persons, without money and without price.”

In comparison it was to about 1861 that he looked when he wrote in his 1886 book Esoteric Christianity (Preface dated March 7, 1886), p. 114:

“During the last quarter of a century, by an application of this principal, I have wrought many “miracles” (in the popular estimation), and a large proportion of the marvels of healing, witnessed at the present time, are illustrations of the principle we are discussing in this article.”

== Writing ==
Evans was the first author to write about the New Thought movement. His first major book on the matter was published three years after Quimby died, and he continued writing for the rest of his life. (While The Mental-Cure is generally considered to be the first book on mental healing by Evans, he actually wrote against that belief in 1884 in the Preface to his book, The Primitive Mind-Cure: “This volume is designed to contribute something toward supplying the demand in the public for further light on the subject upon which it treats,—the cure of disease in ourselves and others by mental and spiritual agencies. The first work of the author having a relation to the subject, was published over twenty-two years ago. It was followed, at intervals of different length, by four other volumes, which have had an extensive circulation in every part of the country, and to some extent Europe.” The book he was referring to from twenty-two years earlier was The Celestial Dawn.)

- (1860) The Happy Islands; or, Paradise Restored
- (1860) Divine Order in the Process of Full Salvation printed in The Guide to Holiness periodical
- (1862) The Celestial Dawn; or Connection of Earth and Heaven
- (1864) The New Age and Its Messenger
- (1869) The Mental Cure: Illustrating the Influence of the Mind on the Body, Both in Health and Disease, and the Psychological Method of Treatment
- (1872) Mental Medicine
- (1876) Soul and Body
- (1881) The Divine Law of Cure
- (1885) The Primitive Mind Cure
- (1886) Esoteric Christianity and Mental Therapeutics

There is an Evans manuscript in the United States National Library of Medicine consisting of handwritten text over two bound notebooks, dated about 1883. The journals of Evans, now at Dartmouth College, were transcribed and printed in 2016 by Catherine L. Albanese.
