= Dress (disambiguation) =

A dress is a garment consisting of a skirt with an attached bodice or with a matching bodice giving the effect of a one-piece garment. Dress may also refer to:

== Attire ==
- Clothing in general
  - Costume, fancy dress
  - Dress uniform, formal military attire
  - Standard diving dress, old heavy canvas diving-suit with a large metal helmet
- To dress a set, in film or theater production

== Music ==
- Dress (Shizuka Kudo album), 1997
- Dress (Sophie Villy album), 2014
- "Dress" (PJ Harvey song), 1991
- "Dress" (Buck-Tick song), 1993
- "Dress" (Taylor Swift song), 2017

== Surname ==
- Andreas Dress (1938–2024), German mathematician
- Evelyne Dress (born 1947), French actress

== Other ==
- Dress (film), 2023 short film set in Hawaii
- DRESS syndrome, Drug Rash (or Reaction) with Eosinophilia and Systemic Symptoms, also known as Drug Hypersensitivity Syndrome

== See also ==
- Dres (Polish subculture), a term used in Poland to describe a specific subculture or class of young males
- Dresch, a French motorcycle manufacturer
- The Dress (disambiguation)
- Dressing (disambiguation)
- Dresser (disambiguation)
- Drees
- List of individual dresses
