= Dresang =

Dresang is a surname, and may refer to:

- Christopher Dresang, American politician
- Eliza T. Dresang, American professor of Library Science
- Paul Dresang, American ceramic artist

== See also ==
- Dressing
