= Maella =

- Municipality
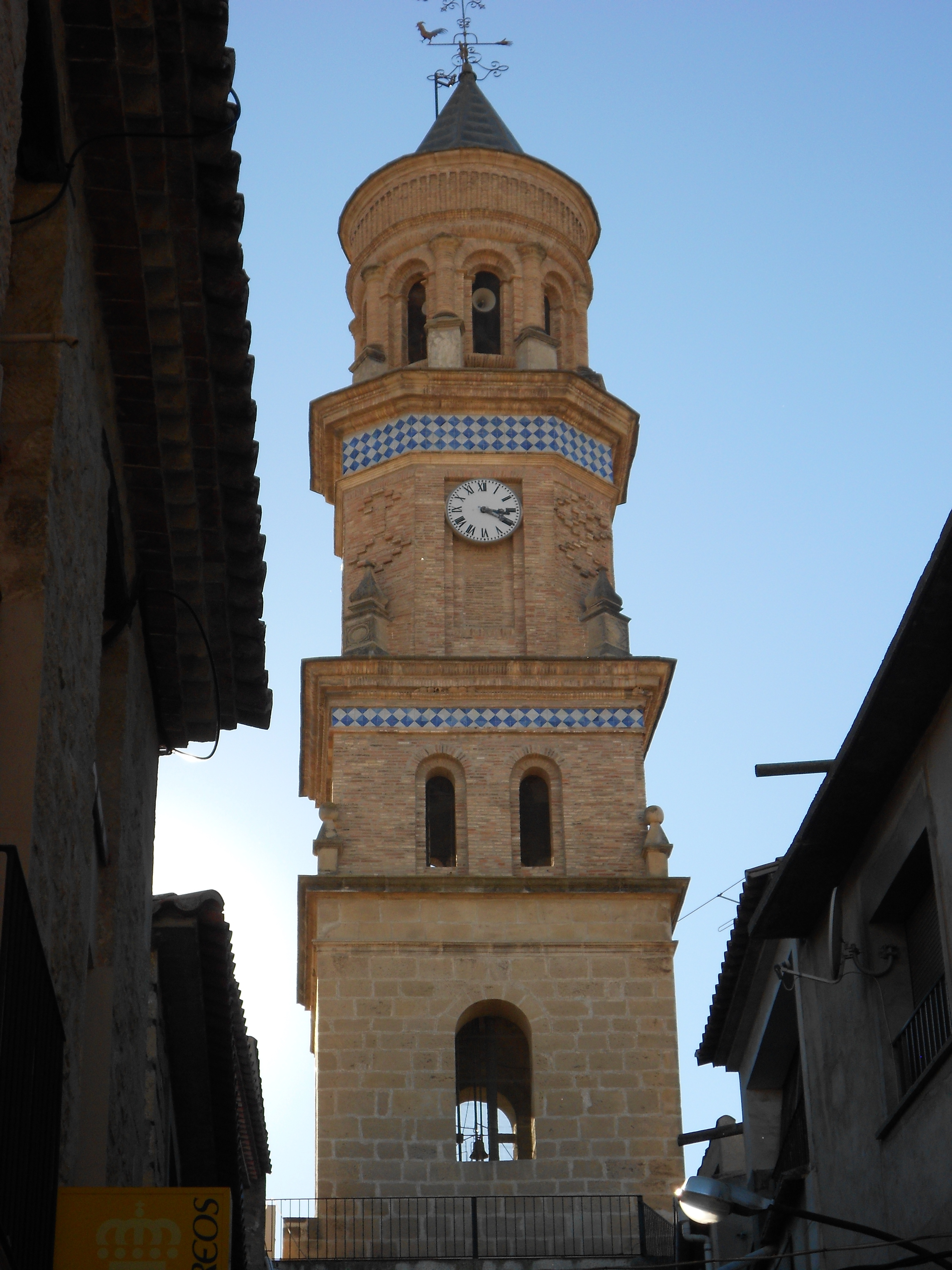
- Clock Tower in Maella

- Flag Coat of arms

- Location of Maella within Aragon Location of Maella within Spain
- Coordinates: 41°08′N 0°09′E
- Country: Spain
- Autonomous community: Aragon
- Province: Zaragoza
- Comarca: Bajo Aragón-Caspe

Area
  - Total: 174.88 km^{2} (67.52 sq mi)

Population (2025-01-01)
  - Total: 2,158
  - Density: 12.34/km^{2} (31.96/sq mi)
- Time zone: UTC+1 (CET)
  - Summer (DST): UTC+2 (CEST)
- Website: maella.es

Maella (Spanish: [maˈeʎa]; Catalan: [maˈeʎə]) is a municipality located in the province of Zaragoza, Aragon, Spain. According to the 2015 census (INE), the municipality has a population of 1,953 inhabitants. This town is located in La Franja; the local dialect is a variant of Catalan.

== History ==
The Battle of Maella took place here in 1838. Historically this town and its municipal term were considered part of the Matarraña, but presently it is included in the Bajo Aragón-Caspe/Baix Aragó-Casp comarca. The sculptor Pablo Gargallo was born here in 1881.

== See also ==
- Trapa de Santa Susana
- Matarraña/Matarranya
- La Franja
- List of municipalities in Zaragoza
