= Trapa de Santa Susana =

Ruined monastery in Aragon, Spain

Coordinates: 41°09′44″N 0°07′51″E

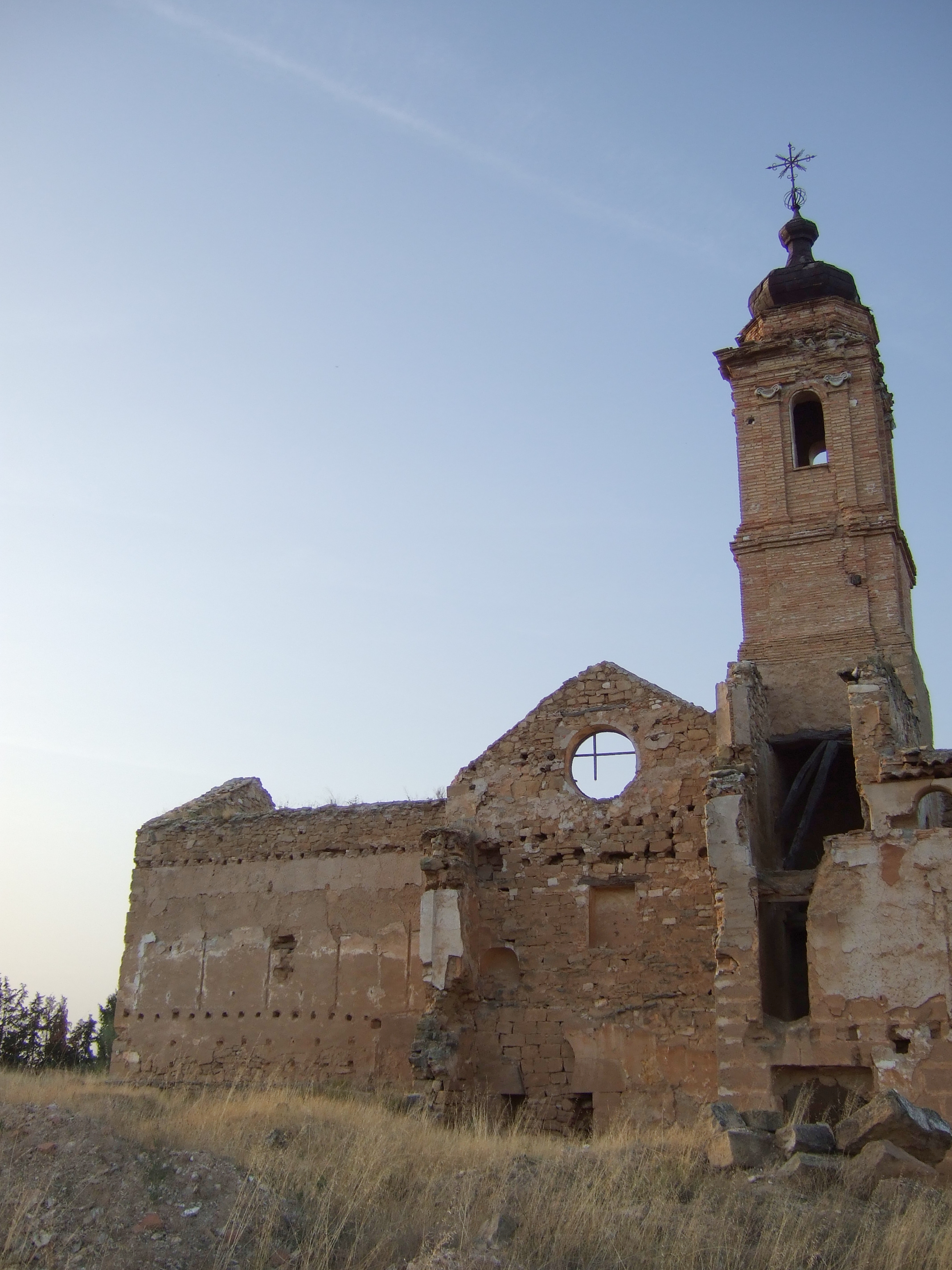
Ruins of the Trapa de Santa Susana monastery

The Monasterio de Santa María de la Trapa de Santa Susana, known simply as Trapa de Santa Susana or La Trapa by local people, is a ruined monastery located close to road A-1411 north of Maella, close to Favara del Matarranya in Aragon, Spain.

The monastery falls within the area of the Maella municipality, in what used to be known as Priorat de Santa Susanna de Maella, Spanish: Priorato de Santa Susana de Maella.

The monastery passed through periods of splendor and decadence throughout its existence, and is now in ruins.

== History ==
The original monastery was established in the 6th century by Benedictine monks who, at some point in its first 600 years, rebuilt it with the help of the Order of Calatrava. This monastery was transferred by James I of Aragon to the Cistercian Order in 1227.

The Cistercians then destroyed the building to erect a new monastery. In the 16th century, Miguel Pérez d'Almazán, Lord of Maella, tried to establish a village close to the monastery under the name Villanueva d'Almazán, but his project failed.

At the time of the French Revolution, some French Trappist monks were welcomed to the monastery and a thriving Trappist community became established in what became known as Trapa de Santa Susana. Despite the ravages caused by the Peninsular War, this community of monks flourished until the mid 19th century, when the Ecclesiastical Confiscations of Mendizábal La Desamortización caused the exclaustration of the monks and brought monastic life on the site to an end.

According to local tradition the monastery was named as it is because, at some point in its history, it had housed the mortal remains of Saint Susanna, known locally as "Virgen de Levante", the 'Levantine Virgin'.

The ruins are located in isolation on one side of the road, and the graceful bell tower is very conspicuous in the relatively desolate landscape, although there are farm buildings on the other side of the road.
