= Drees =

- Municipality
- Coat of arms

- Location of Drees within Vulkaneifel district
- Interactive map of Drees
- Location within Germany Location within Rhineland-Palatinate
- Coordinates: 50°20′28″N 6°59′46″E
- Country: Germany
- State: Rhineland-Palatinate
- District: Vulkaneifel
- Municipal assoc.: Kelberg

Government
  - Mayor (2019–24): Klaus Brachthäuser

Area
  - Total: 4.11 km^{2} (1.59 sq mi)
- Elevation: 500 m (1,600 ft)

Population (2025-12-31)
  - Total: 152
  - Density: 37.0/km^{2} (95.8/sq mi)
- Time zone: UTC+01:00 (CET)
  - Summer (DST): UTC+02:00 (CEST)
- Postal codes: 53520
- Dialling codes: 02691
- Vehicle registration: DAU
- Website: www.drees-eifel.de

Drees is an Ortsgemeinde – a municipality belonging to a Verbandsgemeinde, a kind of collective municipality – in the Vulkaneifel district in Rhineland-Palatinate, Germany. It belongs to the Verbandsgemeinde of Kelberg, whose seat is in the like-named municipality.

== Geography ==
=== Location ===
The municipality lies in the Vulkaneifel, a part of the Eifel known for its volcanic history, geographical and geological features, and even ongoing activity today, including gases that sometimes well up from the earth.

=== Neighbouring municipalities ===
Drees borders in the north on Döttingen, in the northeast on Herresbach, Baar and Mittelbaar, in the east on Niederbaar, in the southeast on Nitz, in the south on Kirsbach, in the southwest on Welcherath, in the west on Nürburg and in the northwest on Meuspath.

== History ==
In 1222, Drees had its first documentary mention under the name Dreyse. The word comes from the Celtic term for "bubbling spring". This is akin to the old Germanic word Thrais, for "bubbles", "to bubble" or "to swirl". The namesake mineral spring, the result of volcanic activity in the area, no longer exists.

The village belonged to the Electorate of Cologne until 1794.

== Politics ==
=== Municipal council ===
The council is made up of 6 council members, who were elected by majority vote at the municipal election held on 7 June 2009, and the honorary mayor as chairman.

=== Mayor ===
Drees's mayor is Klaus Brachthäuser.

=== Coat of arms ===
The German blazon reads: Durch Zinnenschnitt geteilt von Blau und Silber. Oben ein silberner Brunnen mit geteiltem Wasserstrahl. Unten ein rotes Antoniuskreuz mit 2 Pilgerglöckchen.

The municipality's arms might in English heraldic language be described thus: Per fess embattled of seven, azure a fountain with four streams argent, and argent a cross tau, hanging from each arm a bell, gules.

The partition horizontally across the middle in the pattern of a crenellated wall ("Per fess embattled") refers to the time when Drees belonged to the Electorate of Cologne Amt of Nürburg. The fountain is, in a way, a canting charge, referring to the municipality's name, which comes from an old Celtic word for a spring (although it hardly resembles the modern German word for this, Brunnen). The "cross tau" – one without an upper arm – is Saint Anthony's Cross and thus a reference to the municipality's patron saint, whose attributes include this cross and a bell, two of which also appear in these arms.

== Culture and sightseeing ==
=== Buildings ===
- Saint Anthony's and Saint Bernard's Catholic Church (branch church), Kapellenweg 2, quire from 17th century, biaxial aisleless church, late 18th century.
- At Hauptstraße 5 – timber-frame house, part of an estate complex, partly solid, latter half of 19th century.
- Wayside chapel, southwest of the village on the road to Welcherath, plaster building, possibly 18th century, basalt niche cross marked "16?5" (year therefore uncertain).
- Wayside cross, southeast of the village on the road to Nitz, basalt niche cross from 1646.

== Economy and infrastructure ==
=== Transport ===
Among the local roads, Kreisstraße 93 leads northwards towards Döttingen and to Bundesstraße 258. It also leads westwards by way of Nitz, likewise to the B 258. Southwestwards runs Kreisstraße 92 to Welcherath and Landesstraße 94.

=== Established businesses ===
North of the village, west of the road to Döttingen, is found an off-road track in a disused quarry run by the company Camp 4 Fun (even in German) where companies and private citizens can drive off-road vehicles over rough ground for training or leisure.
