= Charles Poyen =

19th-century French hypnotist

Charles Poyen (died 1844) was a French mesmerist or magnetizer (a practitioner of a practice that would later inspire hypnotism). Mesmerism was named after Franz Anton Mesmer, a German physician who argued in 1779 for the existence of a fluid that fills space and through which bodies could influence each other, a force he called animal magnetism.

== Early life ==
Born in France, Poyen studied medicine in Paris. In 1832, while still a student, he fell ill with what he called "a very complicated nervous disease" and turned for help to a Dr. Chapelain. The doctor employed a woman, Madame Villetard, who presented herself as a "somnambulist" (clairvoyant). After being put in a trance by Chapelain, Villetard reportedly described Poyen's symptoms exactly, including which food and drink agreed with him, which convinced him to investigate mesmerism. Poyen had further experiences of mesmerism during a visit to his family's sugar plantation in Martinique and Guadeloupe in the French West Indies.

== Lecturing ==
In 1834 Poyen decided to move to the United States for the climate and sailed from Pointe-à-Pitre, Guadaloupe, arriving in Portland, Maine. After staying for five months with an uncle in Haverhill, Massachusetts, he moved to Lowell, where he taught French and drawing. In January 1836 he began lecturing about mesmerism in and around Boston; As word spread, people would volunteer to be treated by him. The following month, the Boston Medical and Surgical Journal (BMSJ) published extracts from Poyen's second lecture:

The person who is to be magnetized is placed in the sitting position ... The magnetizer, sitting on a little higher seat, before his face, and at about a foot distant ... holds the thumbs of the patient, and remains in this position until he feels that the same degree of heat is established between the thumbs of that person and his own. Then he draws off his hands in turning them outwards, and places them upon the shoulders for nearly a minute. Afterwards he carries them down slowly, by a sort of friction very light, along the arms, down to the extremities of the fingers. He begins again the same motion five or six times; it is what magnetizers call passes. Then he passes his hands over the head, keeps them there a few moments, brings them down in passing before the face, at the distance of one or two inches, to the epigastrium ... And he thus comes down slowly along the body, to the feet.

Poyen said that his effect on patients differed: sometimes they felt calmer, sometimes more agitated, sometimes hot or cold, sometimes there was pain. But "[a]lmost always the patient feels relieved of his usual pain, and sometimes the symptoms of the existing sickness cease as by a charm." Poyen believed this demonstrated the existence of a "magnetical agent".

The BMSJ described Poyen: "In person, Dr. Poyen was of a middle height; rather slender, yet well formed. Nearly one half of his face was covered, or rather discolored, by a naevus, of a dark-red hue, which greatly modified the natural expression. The cranial region for firmness was raised quite high enough to indicate obstinacy. He was habitually grave, thoughtful, industrious and studious, but not a close reasoner, nor by any means an original or profound thinker. Whatever was marvellous or extraordinary engaged his earnest consideration, particularly if it could be dragged into the service of the dearest of all interests—animal magnetism."

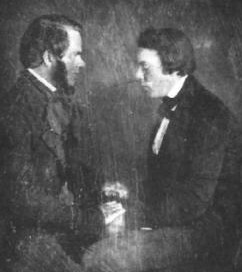
Phineas Parkhurst Quimby (left), putting his assistant Lucius Burkmar in a trance.

Among those listening to Poyen lecture in 1836 in Bangor, Maine, was Phineas Parkhurst Quimby, at the time a watchmaker, later a self-described "mentalist" who influenced the New Thought movement. According to Willa Cather and Georgine Milmine, writing for McClure's in 1907, Quimby was so excited by Poyen's lectures that he "followed him from town to town". However, there is no record of Quimby following Poyen or seeing more than one or his lectures. Quimby himself wrote he had heard just one of Poyen's lectures and had "pronounced it a humbug as a matter of course" describing Poyen as someone "who did not appear to be highly blest with the powers of magnetising". Later Quimby hired an assistant, Lucius Burkmar, and from 1843 to 1847 put him in trances in front of audiences; Burkmar would purport to read minds and diagnose the audience's illnesses.

== Death ==
Poyen returned to France and died in Bordeaux in 1844, just as he about to sail back to the United States. "Having sown the seed," the BMSJ wrote, "... a mighty host of animal magnetizers sprung up in a trice; they swarmed throughout the length and breadth of the northern States, like locusts; but having used up the resources of their silly admirers, and devoured the green leaves of vulgar Popularity, they gradually died away, one after another, and have now become, in vulgar parlance, the laughing stock of every commonsense community. After the manner of Lycurgus, when he had fairly imposed his system of laws upon the Spartans, Dr. P. left the Continent; and when on the point of returning to ascertain the workings of the machinery he had set in motion, death dropped the curtain, and his career on earth was closed forever."

== Selected works ==
- Husson, M., Charles Poyen, David K. Hitchcock, Report on the magnetical experiments made by the commission of the Royal Academy of Medicine, of Paris, read in the meetings of June 21 and 28, 1831, Boston: D. K. Hitchcock, 9 Cornhill, 1836. OCLC 173509152
- Poyen, Charles. Progress of Animal Magnetism in New England, Boston: Weeks, Jordan & Company, 1837 (archive.org). OCLC 1577289
- Poyen, Charles. A letter to Col. Wm. L. Stone of New York, on the facts related in his letter to Dr. Brigham, and a plain refutation of Durant's exposition of animal magnetism, &c., Boston: Weeks, Jordan and Company; New York: C. Shepard, 1837. OCLC 53329235
