= Phineas Parkhurst Quimby =

American writer and folk healer, 1802 – 1866

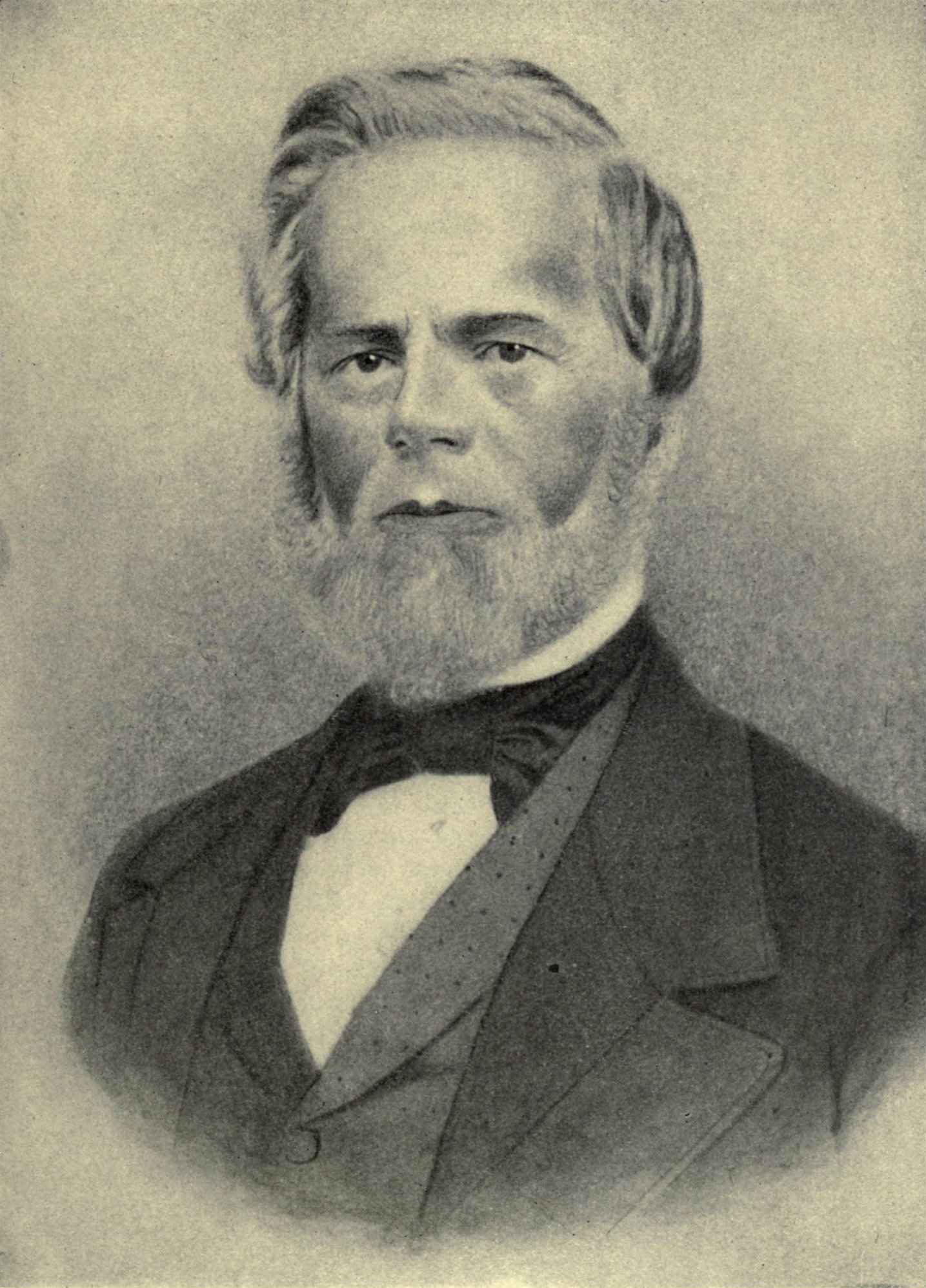
- Born: Phineas Parkhurst Quimby; February 16, 1802; Lebanon, New Hampshire, US
- Died: January 16, 1866 (aged 63); Belfast, Maine, US
- Occupations: Mesmerist, watch and clockmaker, inventor
- Known for: New Thought

Phineas Parkhurst Quimby (February 16, 1802 – January 16, 1866) was an American folk healer, mentalist and mesmerist. His work is widely recognized as foundational to the New Thought spiritual movement.

== Early life ==
Born in the small town of Lebanon, New Hampshire, Quimby was one of seven children and the son of a blacksmith and his wife. As was customary for his social and economic class at that time, Quimby received little formal education. He later wrote that he suffered from consumption (now called tuberculosis) in his youth, a disease that then had no cure, and was prescribed calomel by his doctor. The calomel was no cure, and began to rot his teeth.

Quimby began experimenting with his own ideas for a cure. He found that intense excitement (such as galloping on his horse) alleviated his pain for brief periods of time, and he became interested in the mind's ability to affect the body. He claimed to have cured himself of consumption by his methods.

== Mesmerism ==
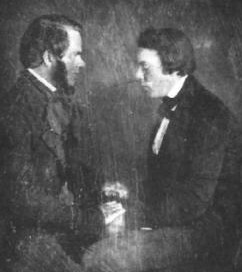
Quimby and Lucius Burkmar

About 1836 Charles Poyen came to Maine from France on an extended lecture tour in New England about mesmerism, also widely known as hypnotism. He was a French mesmerist who followed in the tradition of Armand-Marie-Jacques de Chastenet, Marquis of Puységur. The McClure’s magazine 1907 biographical serial of Mary Baker Eddy written by Willa Cather & Georgine Milmine started the misunderstanding that Quimby was a follower of Poyen and followed him around—which is not supported by the Quimby family or Quimby's writings. In fact, Quimby wrote about seven years later about hearing Poyen lecture: "Mesmerism was introduced into the U[nited] State[s] by M. Charles Poyen, a French gentleman, who did not appear to be highly blest with the powers of magnetising to the satisfaction of his audience in his public lectures. I had the pleasure of listening to one of his lectures, & pronounced it a humbug as a matter of course. And that his remarkable experiments, which were related, were, in my belief, equally true with witch craft—I had never been a convert to witch craft, nor had even had any personal interviews[?] with ghosts or hobgoblins & therefore considered all stories bordering on the marvelous as delusive—". Instead it appears that it was Robert Hanham Collyer, another practitioner of animal magnetism, who visited Belfast in 1841, who attracted Quimby's interest:

"Next came Dr Collyer, who perhaps did more to excite a spirit of enquirey throughout the community than any who have succeeded."

(Quimby's son George stated in New England Magazine, March, 1888, that "a gentleman visited Belfast, about the year 1838," but an extensive search of Belfast newspapers during that time period finds no visit by Poyen mentioned in 1838, even though Poyen was quite newsworthy. 1838 is too early for Robert Collyer. 1836 appears to be the correct year for Poyen.)

About 1842 Quimby encountered Lucius Burkmar, a local youth who was particularly susceptible to hypnosis. Finding him useful to work with, Quimby and Burkmar developed a tour of their own. Quimby demonstrated mesmeric practice with Burkmar in front of large crowds.

Later Quimby and Burkmar stopped touring. Quimby claimed to heal people of ailments which doctors could not cure. Quimby told his patients that disease was caused by false beliefs, and that the cure was in the explanation of this. Quimby published a flyer, "TO THE SICK," that was used about late 1850s to early 1860s and read as follows. It is an important statement of his beliefs:

DR. P. P. QUIMBY would respectfully announce to the citizens of [blank space to be filled in] and vicinity, that he will be at the [blank space to be filled in] where he will attend to those wishing to consult him in regard to their health, and, as his practise is unlike all other medical practise, it is necessary to say that he gives no medicines and makes no outward applications, but simply sits down by the patients, tells them their feelings and what they think is their disease. If the patients admit that he tells them their feelings, &c., then his explanation is the cure; and, if he succeeds in correcting their error, he changes the fluids of the system and establishes the truth, or health. The Truth is the Cure. This mode of practise applies to all cases. If no explanation is given, no charge is made, for no effect is produced. His opinion without an explanation is useless, for it contains no knowledge, and would be like other medical opinions, worse than none. This error gives rise to all kinds of quackery, not only among regular physicians, but those whose aim is to deceive people by pretending to cure all diseases. The sick are anxious to get well, and they apply to these persons supposing them to be honest and friendly, whereas they are made to believe they are very sick and something must be done ere it is too late. Five or ten dollars is then paid, for the cure of some disease they never had, nor ever would have had but for the wrong impressions received from these quacks, or robbers, (as they might be called,) for it is the worst kind of robbery, tho' sanctioned by law. Now, if they will only look at the true secret of this description, they will find it is for their own selfish objects—to sell their medicines. Herein consists their shrewdness!—to impress patients with a wrong idea, namely—that they have some disease. This makes them nervous and creates in their minds a disease that otherwise would never have been thought of. Wherefore he says to such, never consult a quack: you not only lose your money, but your health.

He gives no opinion, therefore you lose nothing. If patients feel pain they know it, and if he describes their pain he feels it, and in his explanation lies the cure. Patients, of course, have some opinion as to what causes pain—he has none, therefore the disagreement lies not in the pain, but in the cause of the pain. He has the advantage of patients, for it is very easy to convince them that he had no pain before he sat down by them. After this it becomes his duty to prove to them the cause of their trouble. This can only be explained to patients, for which explanation his charge is [blank space to be filled in] dollars. If necessary to see them more than once, [blank space to be filled in] dollars. This has been his mode of practice for the last seventeen years. For the past eight years he has given no medicines, nor made any outward applications.

There are many who pretend to practice as he does, but when a person while in "a trance," claims any power from the spirits of the departed, and recommends any kind of medicine to be taken internally or applied externally beware! believe them not, "for by their fruits ye shall know them.

== Personal life ==
Quimby married in 1827 and had a family of four children. One of his sons, George, was a follower and strong defender of him, working to differentiate his work from that of Mary Baker Eddy, a patient who later founded Christian Science. His son owned his father's writings, which were mostly not released until the 1920s, after the son's death.

== Inventor ==
By trade Quimby was a watch and clockmaker. He also was a daguerreotypist, and he invented items and held several patents for a variety of unrelated, larger mechanical devices.

== Patients ==
Among the people who claimed to be cured by Quimby were Julius Dresser and his wife Annetta, the former from "longstanding afflictions" and the later from what at the time may have been labeled hysteria. Their son, Horatio Dresser, wrote extensively on Quimby's theories. He edited and collected many of Quimby's papers in his book Health and the Inner Life: An Analytical and Historical Study of Spiritual Healing and Theories (1906). He also edited and published selected Quimby papers in the book, The Quimby Manuscripts (1921).

Mary Baker Eddy, the founder of Christian Science, was perhaps the most influential person connected to Quimby, and according to Garry Wills her relation to Quimby is likely the main reason he is remembered today. She had sought healing from Quimby in 1862 after reading a circular which advertised that he gave "no medicines or outward applications ... The Truth is the Cure." Eddy, who had been brought up in a religious Congregational household, had suffered from illnesses most of her life and had been searching for healing like what she read in the gospel. Later, claims were made that she was at least partially inspired by Quimby in her theology. However, both Quimby's son and Christian Scientists have pointed out major differences between Quimbyism and Christian Science. Biographer Gillian Gill and others agreed, pointing out that because of its theism, Christian Science differs considerably from the teachings of Quimby, who did not base his work in religion.

Warren Felt Evans was a Methodist minister who was moving over to Swedenborgianism about the time that he visited Quimby twice about 1863. While he was reputed to be a student of Quimby, modern scholarship has shown that he considered himself an equal of Quimby and not a student.

== Beliefs ==
Quimby has sometimes been connected with Transcendentalism, especially by historians relying on the Dresser version of his writings, however his knowledge of Emerson and the Transcendentalists "was no doubt tenuous and secondhand at best" according to Albanese, and it was really only "Dresser's spiritualized Quimby that fit this classification" according to Hazen.

== Legacy ==
Quimby is sometimes identified as the "founder of New Thought," but his actual influence is debated. Since Quimby's writings were not available until Dresser's The Quimby Manuscripts in 1921, they did not directly effect New Thought's development during its formative period.

== Bibliography ==
Although Quimby never published anything in his lifetime, a number of his writings have been published after his death. The publication of Quimby's writings and their editors are as follows:

- Dresser, Horatio W., ed. (1921). The Quimby Manuscripts Showing the Discovery of Spiritual Healing and the Origin of Christian Science, Thomas Y. Crowell Co. ISBN 0-7661-4052-0
- Seale, Ervin, ed. (1988). The Complete Writings: Volume 1. Marina Del Rey, CA: DeVorss & Co. ISBN 0-87516-600-8
- _____ (1988). The Complete Writings: Volume 2. Marina Del Rey, CA: DeVorss & Co. ISBN 0-87516-601-6
- _____ (1988). The Complete Writings: Volume 3. Marina Del Rey, CA: DeVorss & Co. ISBN 0-87516-602-4
- Clark, Mason A., ed. (1982). The Healing Wisdom of Dr. P. P. Quimby: Selected Notes from the Dresser and Collie Compilations of the Quimby Manuscripts. Los Altos: Frontal Lobe. ISBN 0-931400-02-3
- Hughes, Ronald A., ed. (2009). Phineas Parkhurst Quimby: His Complete Writings and Beyond: Including the Missing Works of P. P. Quimby. Phineas Parkhurst Quimby Resource Center.

== See also ==
- Philosophy of mind – Branch of philosophy
- Mind–body dualism – Philosophical view that consiousness and the body are fundamentally different
- Dualistic cosmology – Two fundamental and often opposing concepts

== Sources ==
- Albanese, Catherine L., ed. (2016). The Spiritual Journals of Warren Felt Evans from Methodism to Mind Cure. Bloomington, IN: Indiana University Press.
- Albanese, Catherine L. (2007). A Republic of Mind and Spirit: A Cultural History of American Metaphysical Religion. New Haven, CT: Yale University Press.
- Albanese, Catherine L. (December 1986) "Physic and Metaphysic in Nineteenth-Century America: Medical Sectarians and Religious Healing", Church History, Vol. 55, No. 4., pp. 489–502.
- Gill, Gillian (1998). Mary Baker Eddy. Cambridge, MA: Perseus Books.
- Gottschalk, Stephen (1973). The Emergence of Christian Science in American Religious Life. Berkeley, CA: University of California Press.
- Hazen, Craig James (2000). The Village Enlightenment in America: Popular Religion and Science in the Nineteenth Century. Urbana, IN: University of Illinois Press
- Holmes, S. W. (September 1944). "Phineas Parkhurst Quimby: Scientist of Transcendentalism", The New England Quarterly, Vol.17, No.3, pp. 356–380.
- McNeil, Keith (2020). A Story Untold: A History of the Quimby-Eddy Debate. Carmel, IN: Hawthorne Publishing, 2020. Three vols.
- Satter, Beryl (1999). Each Mind A Kingdom: American Women, Sexual Purity, and the New Thought Movement, 1875-1920. Berkeley, CA: University of California Press.
- Voorhees, Amy B. (2021). A New Christian Identity: Christian Science Origins and Experience in American Culture. Chapel Hill, NC: University of North Carolina Press.
- Wills, Garry (1994). Certain Trumpets: The Nature of Leadership. New York, NY: Simon & Schuster.
