= The Dress =

The Dress may refer to:

- The dress, a 2015 photograph and Internet phenomenon regarding the perceived colour of a dress
- The Dress (1961 film), an East German film
- The Dress (1964 film), a Swedish film directed by Vilgot Sjöman
- The Dress (1984 film), winner of the 1984 BAFTA Award for Best Short Film
- The Dress (1996 film), a Dutch film
- The Dress (2020 film), a Polish short film
- "The Dress", a track from the Blonde Redhead album 23 (2007)
- "The Dress", a track from the Dijon album Absolutely (2021)
- "The Dress" (The Amazing World of Gumball), a 2011 episode of The Amazing World of Gumball
- Monica Lewinsky's dress, part of the Clinton–Lewinsky scandal

== See also ==
- Dress (disambiguation)
- List of individual dresses
- Black Versace dress of Elizabeth Hurley, often referred to as "That Dress"
