= A Republic of Mind and Spirit =

2007 book on American religion

A Republic of Mind and Spirit: A Cultural History of American Metaphysical Religion
- Cover
- Author: Catherine L. Albanese
- Language: English
- Genre: non-fiction
- Publisher: Yale University Press
- Publication date: 2007
- Pages: 628 + xi
- ISBN: 9780300134773
- OCLC: 191732654

A Republic of Mind and Spirit: A Cultural History of American Metaphysical Religion is a 2007 non-fiction book written by Catherine L. Albanese. It was published by Yale University Press. It was published as an ebook in 2017 by the same publisher.

== Synopsis ==
The work is an introduction to Albanese's "metaphysical thesis" of American religious history: metaphysical religion (sometimes described by "the occult"; its adherents are sometimes called "metaphysicians") has a major role in the development of American religiosity rather than a minor one. Albanese's book is split into three sections – "Beginnings", "Transitions", and "Arrivals" – in which Albanese explores and analyzes various groups and ideas from English colonization to the late twentieth century. Albanese identifies four main elements of what constitutes "metaphysical religion": a fixation on the mind, a "cosmological theory of correspondence between worlds", a concern for energy (which Albanese calls "magic"), and salvation through healing.

== Reception ==
Dell deChant for Nova Religio called the book "uniquely valuable to [scholarly] understanding of religion in America, and the field of religious studies as a whole", and he believed that the work distinguished Catherine L. Albanese as "one of today's major American religious historians". W. Clark Gilpin for The Journal of Religion writes that it is a "magisterial book, one that synthesizes and extends a richly productive career of research and publication" on the American metaphysical tradition. Richard Kyle for The Journal of American History called the book "sound" in its scholarship. Robert C. Fuller for Church History called the book "brilliant" and "rich with historical detail". A reviewer for Publishers Weekly called the book "groundbreaking". Dina Komuves for the Library Journal recommended the book for academic libraries with religious studies collections.

Benjamin E. Zeller for Pneuma believes that the book is "impeccably researched"; however, he criticizes the length of the work which he believes makes it "untenable for the undergraduate classroom". David D. Hall for The American Historical Review called it "important as an act of recovery" and a "remarkable demonstration" of Albanese's skills as a historian of religion. However, Hall believes that at some points the intellectual method of the book is weak, and some of the examples, like Christian Science, do not fit perfectly to what she is communicating.

Amanda Porterfield for The New England Quarterly called the book Albanese's magnum opus. However, Porterfield believes that the book's omission of the metaphysicians' claims to science and of any analysis of the social and emotional function of metaphysical religion in America "limit[s] the book's usefulness as a full depiction of metaphysical religion in American history". Additionally, Porterfield believes the book provides an "excessive" number of historical facts about metaphysical thought, making the book "one-sided".

David Nartonis for The Christian Science Monitor argues that although Albanese's book will interest anyone intrigued by contemporary trends and American belief systems, anyone interested in the specific systems she surveys finds that she focuses too much on "the externals that it misses the whole point of their religious conviction".

Jeremy Rapport for The Register of the Kentucky Historical Society believes that Albanese "convincingly argues" that metaphysical religion in American religious history "must be addressed in order to understand what is American about religion in America". According to Rapport, one of the book's strengths is that its "organizational scheme strengthens her claim that metaphysical religions should form a third leg of the American religious tradition" by demonstrating its consistent presence in the historical record. Rapport notes that scholars of specific traditions like Mormonism or New Thought will find flaws with her analysis.

Jerry L. Summers for Fides et Historia compliments the work overall, but he points out that her "powerfully convincing" thesis portrays the "heterodox metaphysics" as the mainstream religion in American history, with which he disagrees.

== See also ==
- Academic study of new religious movements
