= Ramón Cabrera, 1st Duke of Maestrazgo =

Spanish general (1806–1877)

Ramón Cabrera
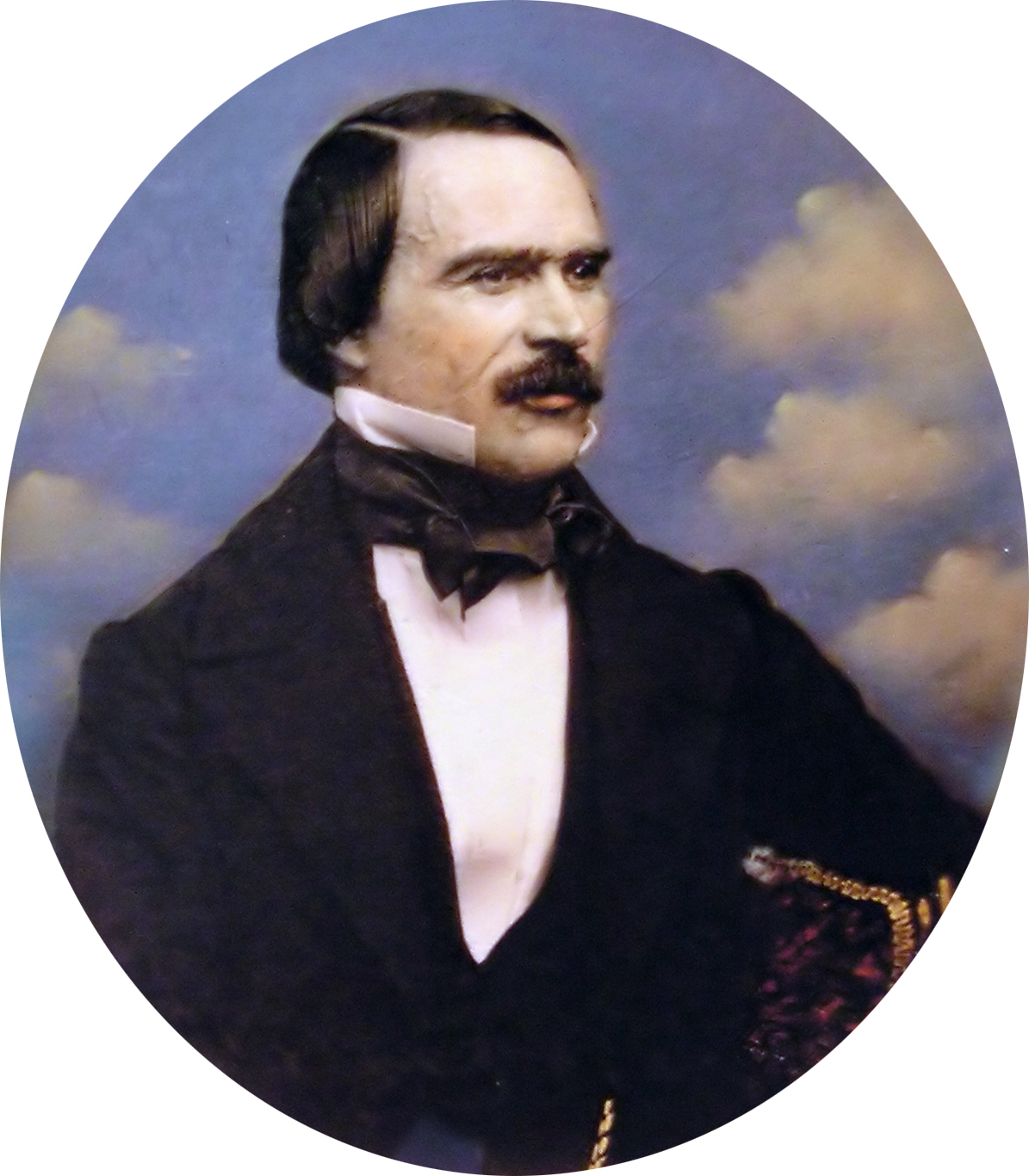
- Daguerreotype of Cabrera, 1850
- Born: 27 December 1806; Tortosa, Catalonia, Spain
- Died: 24 May 1877 (aged 70); London, England, UK
- Spouse: Marianne Catherine Richards
- Issue: 5
- Father: José Cabrera
- Mother: Maria Griñó

Ramón Cabrera y Griñó, 1st Marquis of Ter, 1st Count of Morella (27 December 1806 – 24 May 1877) was a Carlist general of Catalonia. He renounced the combined and Spanish grandee title of 1st Duke of Maestrazgo with its annual stipend in favour of the less fortunate and kept instead both the Borbón recognised Carlist count and the subsequent Borbón marquis nobility titles.

== Life and career ==
He was born at Tortosa in the province of Tarragona, Spain. As his family had in their gift two chaplaincies, young Cabrera was sent to the seminary of Tortosa, where he made himself conspicuous as an unruly pupil, ever mixed up in disturbances and careless in his studies. After he had taken minor orders, the bishop refused to ordain him as a priest, telling him that the Church was not his vocation, and that everything in him showed that he ought to be a soldier. Cabrera followed this advice and took part in Carlist conspiracies on the death of Ferdinand VII of Spain. The authorities exiled him, and he absconded to Morella to join the forces of the pretender Don Carlos.

In this First Carlist War (1833–1839), he rose in a very short time by sheer daring, fanaticism and ferocity to the front rank among the Carlist chiefs who led the bands of Don Carlos in Catalonia, Aragon and Valencia. He raised his own army travelling from village to village. As a raider he was often successful, and he was many times wounded in the brilliant fights in which he again and again defeated the generals of Queen Isabella, such as at the Battle of Maella.

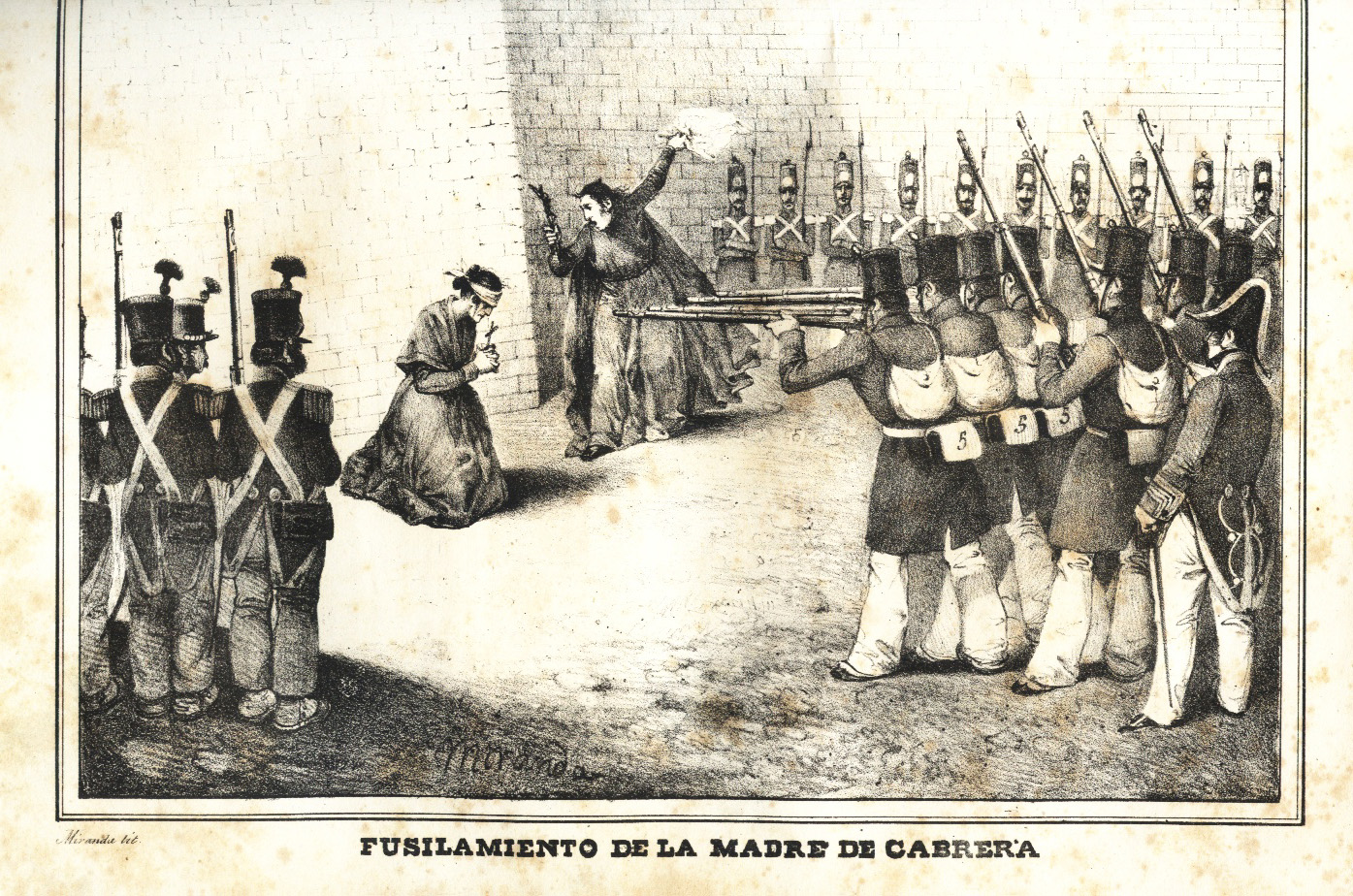
The execution of Cabrera's mother, Maria Griñó, by firing squad, 1836.

At the beginning of the First Carlist War, he released officers and other Isabelino prisoners of war with the promise not to fight him again as fellow Spaniards. Subsequently, the queen's generals seized his mother as a hostage, whereupon Cabrera shot several mayors and officers. General Agustín Nogueras (es) unfortunately caused the mother of Cabrera to be shot also by firing squad as a reprisal. Cabrera vowed 'rivers of blood will flow in Catalonia' after her execution; and the Carlist leader then started upon a policy of reprisals so merciless that the people nicknamed him The Tiger of the Maestrazgo. He shot 1110 prisoners of war, 100 officers and many civilians, including the wives of four leading Isabelinos (Liberals), to avenge his executed mother.

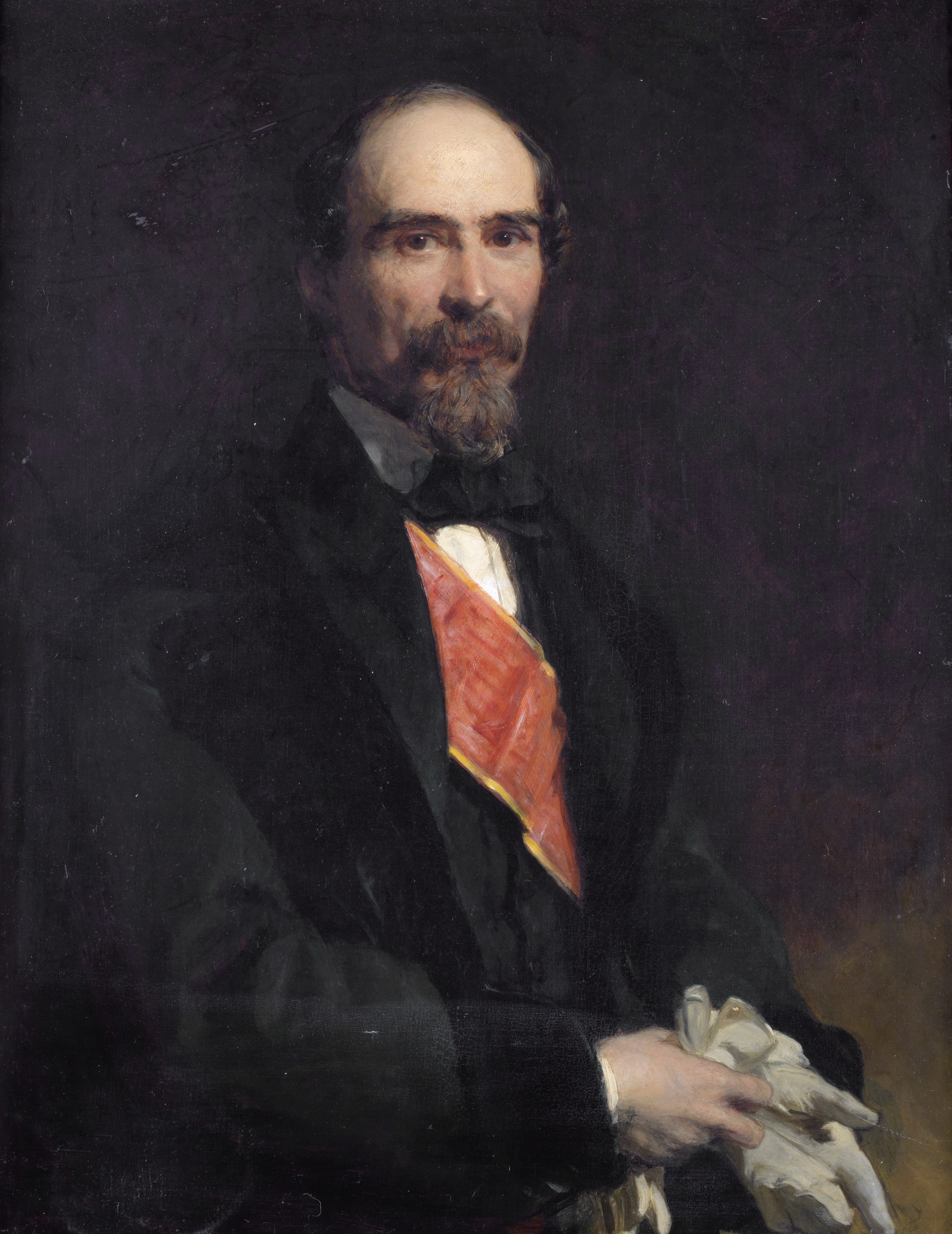
"The tiger of Maestrazgo", portrait painting of Cabrera by John Prescott Knight

When Marshal Espartero induced the Carlists of the north-western provinces, with Maroto at their head, to submit in accordance with the Convention of Vergara, which secured the recognition of the rank and titles of 1000 Carlist officers, Cabrera held out in Central Spain for nearly a year. Marshals Espartero and O'Donnell, with the bulk of the Isabellino armies, had to conduct a long and bloody campaign against Cabrera before they succeeded in driving him into French territory in July 1840. The government of Louis Philippe kept him in a fortress for some months and then allowed him to go to England, where he quarrelled with the pretender, disapproving of his abdication in favor of the count of Montemolin.

In 1848, Cabrera reappeared in the mountains of Catalonia at the head of Carlist bands. These were soon dispersed and he again fled to France. After this last effort he did not take a very active part in the propaganda and subsequent risings of the Carlists, who, however, continued to consult him. He took offence when new men, not a few of them quondam regular officers, became the advisers and lieutenants of Don Carlos in the Third Carlist War which lasted more or less from 1870 to 1876. Indeed, his long residence in England, his marriage with Miss Richards, and his prolonged absence from Spain had much shaken his devotion to his old cause and belief in its success.

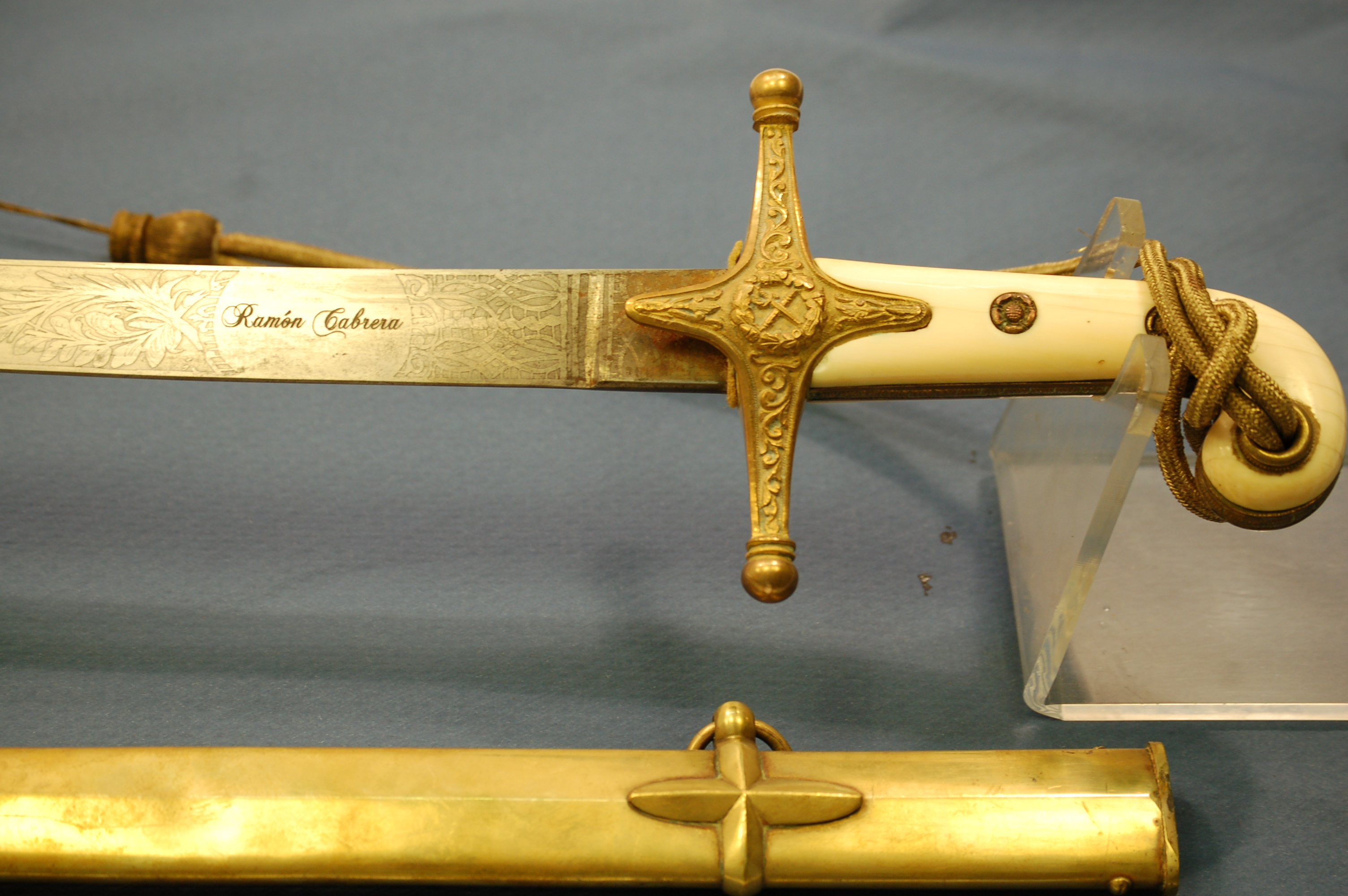
Sword belonging to Cabrera, a gift from Infante Carlos

In March 1875, Cabrera sprang upon Don Carlos a manifesto in which he called upon the adherents of the pretender to follow his own example and submit to the restored monarchy of Alphonso XII, the son of Queen Isabella, who recognized the rank of captain-general and the title of count of Morella conferred on Cabrera by the first pretender. His decision was tempered by his growing belief of the futility of a protracted civil war. Only a very few insignificant Carlists followed Cabrera's example, and Don Carlos issued a proclamation declaring him a traitor and depriving him of all his honours and titles.

The Carlist cause never recovered as a political force from the sole decision of Cabrera, captain-general and formerly the recognised leader of all Carlist forces in defining battlefield victories, to bring a bloody civil war to a definitive end. The Duke of Wellington and contemporary accredited Cabrera as a noteworthy guerrilla leader.

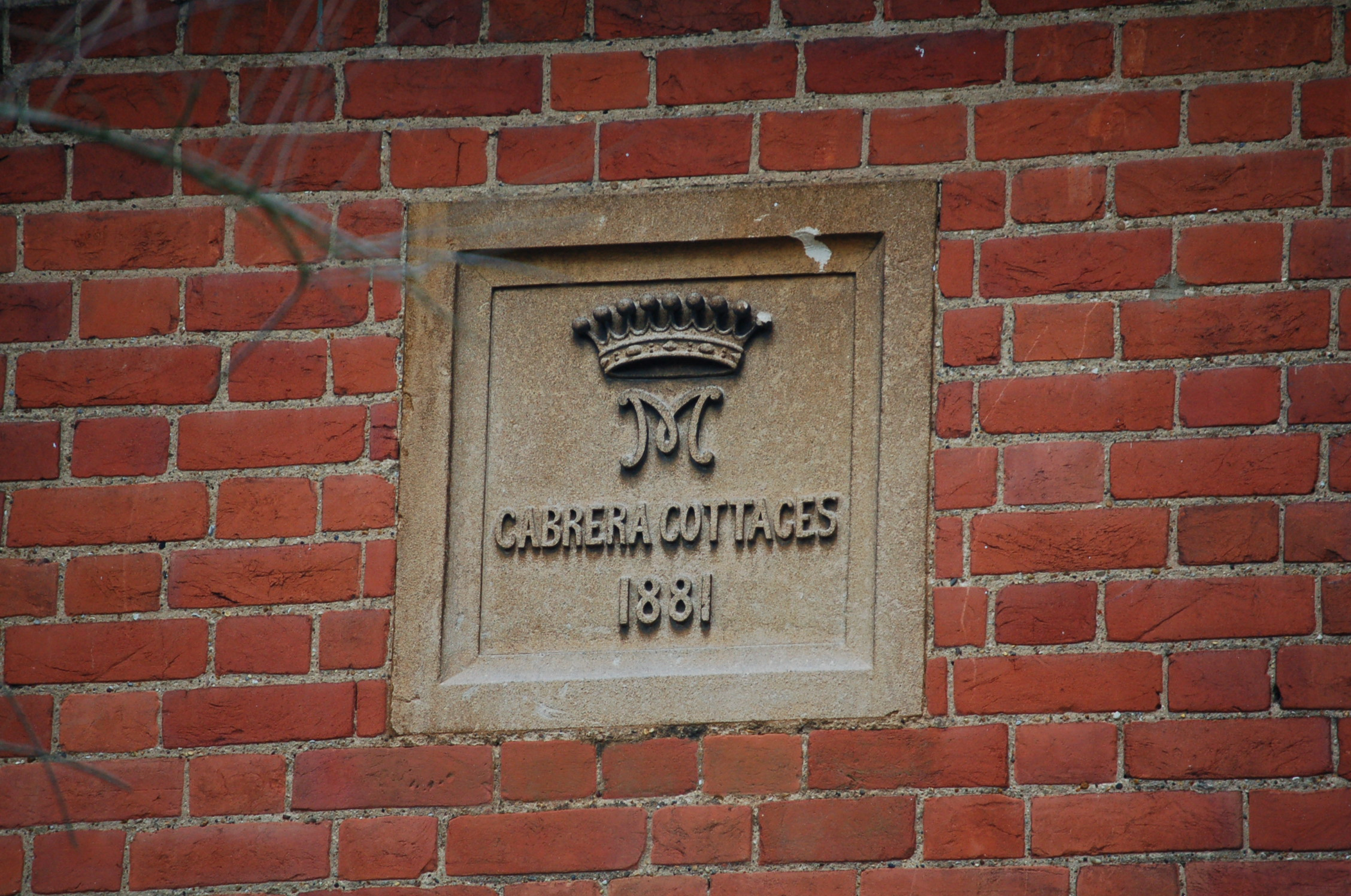
Cabrera's monogram as "Count of Morella" at his estate, now part of the Wentworth Club

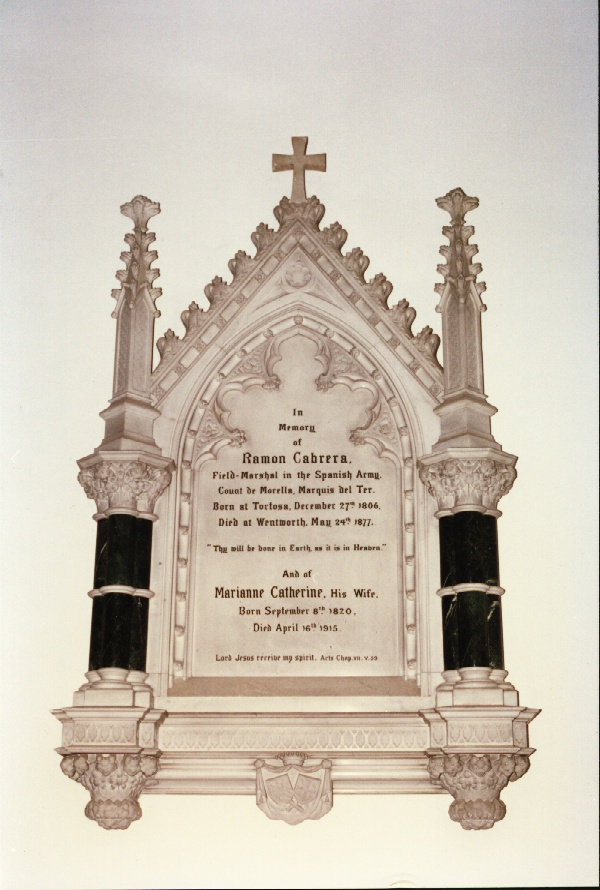
Wall monument in Christ Church, Virginia Water

Cabrera, who was ever afterwards regarded with contempt and execration by the Carlists, died in London on 24 May 1877. He did not receive much attention from the majority of his fellow-countrymen, who commonly said that his disloyalty to his old cause had proved more harmful to him than beneficial to the new state of things. A pension which had been granted to his widow was renounced by her in 1899 in aid of the Spanish treasury after the loss of the colonies.

His tomb, which has Grade II listed building, is in a railed-off section of the churchyard of Christ Church, Virginia Water, Surrey, England. His devoted wife and dedicated conservationist, Marianne née Vaughn-Richards, who survived him by 35 years, is buried alongside him. The marriage bore five children – Maria Teresa, born 1852; Ramon Alexander, born 1854; Ferdinand Augustus, born 1856; Charles Leopold, born 1860; and Ada Constance, born 1862.
