= Dressing =

Dressing commonly refers to the activity of putting on clothing. Dressing may also refer to:

== Technique ==
- Dressing (medical), a medical covering for a wound, usually made of gauze
- Dressing (knot), the process of arranging a knot
- Dressing, the application of a profile onto a grinding wheel
- Dressing, a covering or enhanced construction method to improve an object's appearance:
  - Ashlar, stone dressing(s)
  - Brickwork dressings, using counter-coloured or complementary coloured bricks
  - Stucco (also known as render or rendering):
    - Binder (material) and water applied in decorative fashion; it can also refer to interior
    - aggregates,
    - Plasterwork in relief
  - Well dressing (decoration), a tradition practised in some parts of rural England
- Dressing, the preparation of an animal for consumption or sale, field dressing e.g.
  - Dressed weight, refers to the weight of an animal after being partially butchered
- Ore dressing, mineral processing

== Food ==
- Salad dressing, a type of sauce which is generally poured on a salad, or spread on the bread of a sandwich
- Stuffing, also called dressing, a mixture of various ingredients used to fill a cavity in another food item

== Others ==
- Dressed particle, a bare particle together with some excitations of other quantum fields
- Ship dressing or dressing overall, stringing international maritime signal flags on a ship at special occasions
- "The Dressing", an episode of the Adult Swim animated television series, Aqua Teen Hunger Force

== See also ==
- Covering (disambiguation)
- Dress (disambiguation)
- Dressing Up (disambiguation)
