= Catherine L. Albanese =

Scholar of American religious history

- Born: 1940 (age 85–86); Philadelphia, Pennsylvania, U.S.
- Known for: American metaphysical religion; American religious history; Textbook America: Religions and Religion
- Awards: President, American Academy of Religion (1993–1994); Alumna of the Year, University of Chicago Divinity School (1991); Elected to American Academy of Arts and Sciences (2014)

Academic background
- Education: Chestnut Hill College (B.A., 1962); Duquesne University (M.A., 1968); University of Chicago (Ph.D., 1972)

Academic work
- Institutions: University of California, Santa Barbara
- Notable works: Corresponding Motion (1977); Nature Religion in America (1990); A Republic of Mind and Spirit (2007); The Delight Makers (2024)

Catherine L. Albanese (born 1940) is a religious studies scholar, professor, lecturer, and author. Born and raised in Philadelphia, Pennsylvania, she graduated summa cum laude with a Bachelor of Arts from Chestnut Hill College in 1962. She earned a master's degree in History from Duquesne University in 1968, followed by a Ph.D in History of Christianity at the University of Chicago in 1972. In 1991, Albanese was named Alumna of the Year by the Divinity School of the University of Chicago.

She joined the Department of Religious Studies at University of California, Santa Barbara in 1987. She primarily taught courses in American Religious History, and served as chair of the department later in her career in 2005. In 2008, Albanese was appointed as the J. F. Rowny Endowed Chair in Comparative Religions in the Department of Religious Studies at UCSB, a title she held until her retirement from the department in 2010.

Albanese was influential in founding the North American Religions Section of the American Academy of Religion (AAR) in the 1970s. In 1994, she was elected president of the AAR for the '93-'94 term. She was elected a member of the distinguished American Academy of Arts and Sciences in 2014.

She is the author of many groundbreaking publications in the field of religious studies. Her textbook, America: Religions and Religion, which is currently in its fifth edition, has become the standard introduction to the study of American religious traditions. Other books she has authored include: Corresponding Motion: Transcendental Religion and the New America (1977), Nature Religion in America: From the Algonkian Indians to the New Age (1990), and A Republic of Mind and Spirit: A Cultural History of American Metaphysical Religion (2007). She has authored numerous articles in the study of metaphysical traditions in North America, and was the editor of The Spirituality of the American Transcendentalists: Selected Writings of Ralph Waldo Emerson, Amos Bronson Alcott, Theodore Parker and Henry David Thoreau, which was published in 1988. Her most recent book, The Delight Makers: Anglo-American Metaphysical Religion and the Pursuit of Happiness, was published with The University of Chicago Press in 2024.

As of October 2021, Albanese is the J. F. Rowny Distinguished Professor Emerita of Comparative Religions in the Department of Religious Studies at University of California, Santa Barbara. She continues to write and take an active interest in historical work in American religion.
