= Battle of Maella =

Battle of the First Carlist War

- Part of First Carlist War
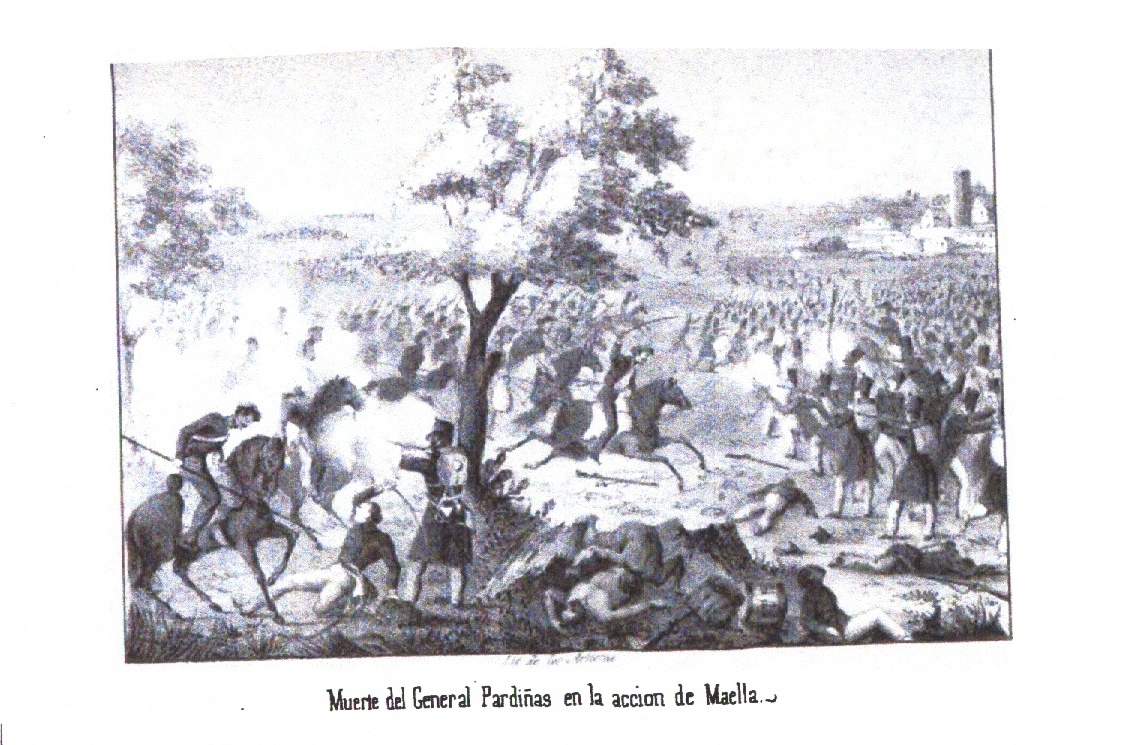
- The death of General Pardiñas in the Battle of Maella
Date	1 October 1838
Location	Maella, Aragon, Spain 41.11370°N 0.08956°E
Result	Carlist victory

Belligerents
Carlists supporting Infante Carlos of Spain	Liberals (Isabelinos or Cristinos) supporting Isabella II of Spain and her regent mother Maria Christina

Commanders and leaders
Ramón Cabrera	Ramón Pardiñas †; Cayetano de Urbina; Pascual Älvarez; Anselmo Blaser

Strength
3,500 infantrymen and 500 cavalry	5,000 infantry and 300 cavalry

Casualties and losses
264 dead and wounded	3,115 captured

The Battle of Maella took place during the First Carlist War on Monday, October 1, 1838, near the Aragonese town of Maella. The battle was a Carlist victory and resulted in the routing of most of the Liberal forces. The Carlist forces were composed of some 3,500 infantrymen and 500 cavalry. The Liberals counted on some 5,000 infantry and 300 cavalry.

During the fighting, Ramón Cabrera was wounded in the arm but led a desperate cavalry charge, raising the morale of his forces and throwing the Liberal forces into disarray. The Liberal forces counterattacked, throwing the Carlist left guard into disarray. However, Cabrera led four companies of infantry and defeated the Liberal forces. Pardiñas also attempted to rally his troops, but was unsuccessful, and he died in combat.

The Liberals retreated to Caspe.

== Sources ==
  - Córdoba, Buenaventura: "Vida militar y política de Ramón Cabrera"; Tomo III. 1844
  - Calbo y Rochina, Dámaso: “Historia de Cabrera y de la guerra civil en Aragón Valencia y Murcia”. 1845
  - Pirala, Antonio: "Historia de la Guerra Civil y de los partidos liberal y carlista". 1853
  - Ferrer Dalmau, Melchor: "História del Tradicionalismo español"; Tomo XIII. 1947
