= Welcherath =

- Municipality
- Coat of arms

- Location of Welcherath within Vulkaneifel district
- Interactive map of Welcherath
- Location within Germany Location within Rhineland-Palatinate
- Coordinates: 50°19′11.98″N 6°57′55.86″E
- Country: Germany
- State: Rhineland-Palatinate
- District: Vulkaneifel
- Municipal assoc.: Kelberg

Government
  - Mayor (2019–24): Winfried Rech

Area
  - Total: 3.18 km^{2} (1.23 sq mi)
- Elevation: 505 m (1,657 ft)

Population (2025-12-31)
  - Total: 108
  - Density: 34.0/km^{2} (88.0/sq mi)
- Time zone: UTC+01:00 (CET)
  - Summer (DST): UTC+02:00 (CEST)
- Postal codes: 53518
- Dialling codes: 02692
- Vehicle registration: DAU

Welcherath is an Ortsgemeinde – a municipality belonging to a Verbandsgemeinde, a kind of collective municipality – in the Vulkaneifel district in Rhineland-Palatinate, Germany. It belongs to the Verbandsgemeinde of Kelberg, whose seat is in the like-named municipality.

== Geography ==
The municipality lies in the Vulkaneifel, a part of the Eifel known for its volcanic history, geographical and geological features, and even ongoing activity today, including gases that sometimes well up from the earth.

== History ==
Welcherath had its first documentary mention in an undated document from Archbishop of Trier Ruotbert (931–56), although at least one writer claims that this document is actually a falsification from about 1100. This would mean that Welcherath's first documentary mention actually came somewhat later than is locally and popularly believed, and, given the document's allegedly false contents, it would also profoundly alter the date on which Welcherath became a parish in its own right to 1654, a full 700 years later than this alleged forgery would suggest.

In 1138, the village belonged to Laach Abbey. In feudal times, the village was held by the County of Virneburg. Under Prussian administration, Welcherath was a municipality in the Bürgermeisterei (“Mayoralty”) of Kelberg in the Adenau district. In the course of administrative restructuring in Rhineland-Palatinate in 1970, the village was grouped along with the others in the Amt of Kelberg into the Daun district, which has since been given the name Vulkaneifel.

== Politics ==
=== Municipal council ===
The council is made up of 6 council members, who were elected by majority vote at the municipal election held on 7 June 2009, and the honorary mayor as chairman.

=== Mayor ===
Welcherath's mayor is Winfried Rech, and his deputy is Andreas Stein.

=== Coat of arms ===
The German blazon reads: In Silber zwei sich bei der Hand fassende Personen (männlich und weiblich) in roten Gewändern mit goldenem Besatz und goldenem Nimbus.

The municipality's arms might in English heraldic language be described thus: Argent Chrysanthus and Daria proper in their glory, holding hands, vested gules garnished Or.

Saints Chrysanthus and Daria, two martyrs who appear as charges in the municipal arms, are Welcherath's patron saints. The composition seen here is taken from an old court seal from 1691.

== Culture and sightseeing ==
Buildings:

- Saints Chrysanthus's and Daria's Catholic Parish Church (Pfarrkirche St. Chrysantius und Daria), Hauptstraße – quire 1705, nave (aisleless church) 1750-1752, expanded 1832-1835; basalt Crucifixion group from 1694.
- Hauptstraße – wayside cross, basalt beam cross from 1658.
- Near Hauptstraße 2 – wayside cross, basalt shaft cross from 1732.
- Hauptstraße/corner of Heiligenweg – wayside cross, basalt shaft cross from 1732.
- Hauptstraße/corner of Kirchstraße – wayside cross, basalt shaft cross from about 1730.
