= Dressing Up =

Dressing Up may refer to:

- Dressing up: Disguise
- Trick-or-treating

== Music ==
- "Dressing Up", a song by the Cure from their album The Top
- "Dressin' Up", a song by Katy Perry
