= The Dresser (disambiguation) =

The Dresser is a play by Ronald Harwood.

The Dresser may also refer to:

- The Dresser (1983 film), 1983 film based on the play
- The Dresser (2015 film), 2015 television film based on the play
