= Constantin Budișteanu =

Romanian soldier and politician

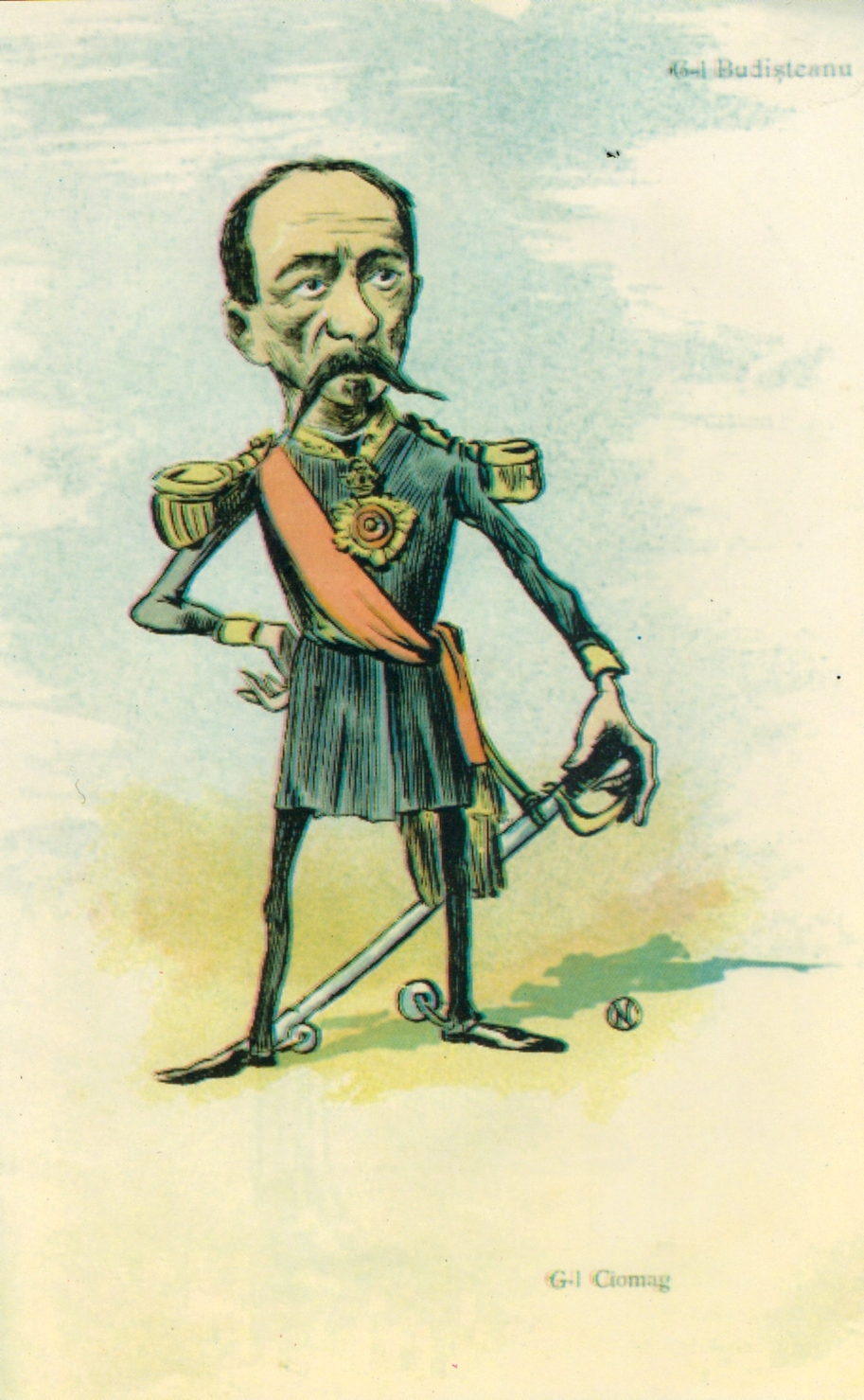
Caricature by Nicolae Petrescu Găină (1898)

Constantin Budișteanu (21 September or 4 November 1838–7 November 1911) was a Wallachian-born Romanian soldier and politician.

Born in Bucharest, he was descended from an old Wallachian boyar family; his father Nicolae was a serdar. He attended the military school in his native city from 1854 to 1856, forming part of the first graduating class, and continued his army studies abroad. Budișteanu's training set him on a path to advancement in the ranks, starting with infantry second lieutenant in 1856 and moving to general staff lieutenant (1860), military engineers captain (1862), major (1867), lieutenant-colonel (1871), colonel (1876), brigadier-general (1883), and division general in charge of an army corps (1891-1895). A participant in the Romanian War of Independence, he was gravely wounded in October 1877, during the Siege of Plevna.

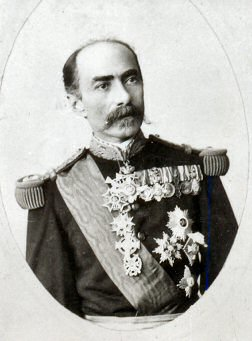
Portrait as War Minister (1895–1896)

Budișteanu belonged to the National Liberal Party; he was elected senator (1884, 1892, 1895) and deputy (1888). From January 1909 to January 1911, he was Senate President. He served as War Minister under Dimitrie Sturdza from November 1895 to November 1896. In 1897, he resigned from the army. Among the honors he accrued for his military service were the Military Virtue Medal, the Order of the Star of Romania, and the Danube Crossing Cross. Budișteanu was long active in the Cultural League, established in 1890 in order to promote the political unification of the Romanian lands.

A street in Sector 1 of Bucharest is named after him.
