= Dresser Island =

Island in Missouri, U.S.

Coordinates: 38°54′36″N 90°15′12″W

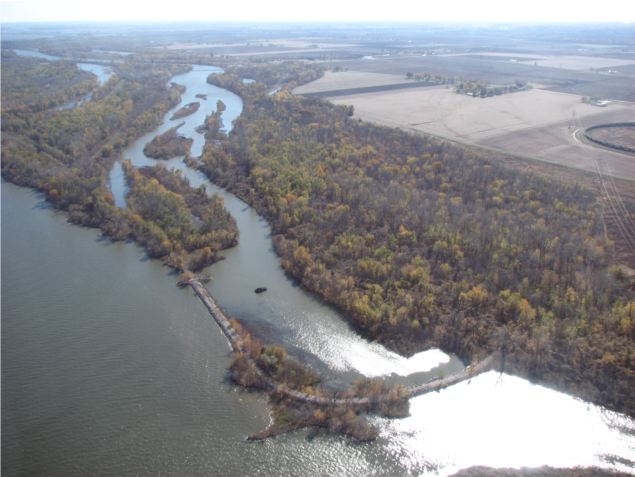
Dresser Island

Dresser Island is an island in the Mississippi River.The island is entirely within St. Charles County, Missouri.

Dresser Island has the name of Thomas Dresser, a local landowner.
