= Horatio Dresser =

New Thought author and early historian

Horatio W. Dresser
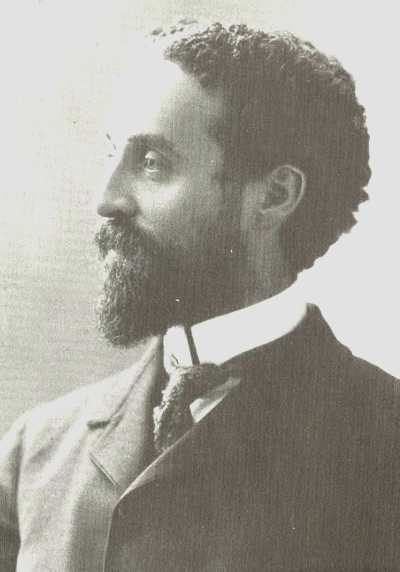
- Horatio Dresser sometime before 1900
- Born: January 15, 1866; Yarmouth, Maine, US
- Died: March 30, 1954 (aged 88); Boston, Massachusetts, US
- Occupations: Minister, author
- Known for: New Thought author
- Parent(s): Julius and Annetta Dresser

Horatio Willis Dresser (January 15, 1866 – March 30, 1954) was a New Thought religious leader and author in the United States. In 1919 he became a minister of General Convention of the Church of the New Jerusalem, and served briefly at a Swedenborgian church in Portland, Maine.

In addition to his writings on New Thought, Dresser is known for having edited two books of selected papers by Phineas Parkhurst Quimby. Both of Dresser's parents had studied with the mesmerist, who influenced the New Thought movement.

== Early life ==
Dresser was born January 15, 1866, in Yarmouth, Maine, to Julius and Annetta Seabury Dresser. His parents were involved in the early New Thought movement through their being treated by and then studying with Phineas Parkhurst Quimby. They became his early followers, along with Mary Baker Eddy.

After Horatio was born, the Dressers moved out west, with Julius Dresser working as a newspaper editor first in Colorado and then California. Horatio left school at 13 to work, and in 1882, the family moved back to Boston. In Boston, Julius Dresser became embroiled in a controversy with Eddy, who by then had founded the Christian Science church. Horatio's father accused Eddy of stealing Quimby's concepts and using them as a basis for her system of Christian Science. Julius also appeared in court on behalf of Edward J. Arens, who had been accused of plagiarizing Eddy and who in his defense unsuccessfully sued Eddy for plagiarizing Quimby.

After attending local schools, Horatio Dresser was admitted to Harvard in 1891. He dropped out in 1893 upon the death of his father. Ten years later he returned to Harvard, completing his Ph.D. in 1907.

== Career ==
In 1895, Dresser became involved with the Metaphysical Club of Boston, a group which he later referred to as the "first permanent New Thought club". That same year, Dresser published his first book, The Power of Silence. In 1896, Dresser founded the Journal of Practical Metaphysics. Two years later, this journal was merged into The Arena, for which Dresser was subsequently an associate editor. The following year, 1899, Dresser founded another New Thought magazine, The Higher Law. He was a past president of the International New Thought Alliance.

He started lecturing about New Thought, speaking to audiences in major cities throughout the country. In 1900 the Atlanta Constitution described him in the following terms:

Tall and slender, with a finely modeled head, which is poised on a magnificent pair of shoulders; his general athletic appearance indicates something more than mere student ... His delivery is plain, straightforward, and unadorned with the flowers of rhetoric.

Dresser taught at Ursinus College in Philadelphia, Pennsylvania, from 1911 to 1913. In 1919, he became a minister of the General Convention of the Church of the New Jerusalem, a denomination built around the teachings of Emanuel Swedenborg, briefly serving as a pastor of a Swedenborgian church in Portland, Maine.

== Writings ==
=== The Quimby Manuscripts ===
Despite never meeting him, Horatio Dresser was a strong advocate of Phineas Parkhurst Quimby. Dresser sometimes extreme adulation of Quimby led one Quimby acolyte to deduce that Horatio Dresser was actually a reincarnation of Quimby. In 1921, after the Library of Congress made Quimby's papers publicly available, Dresser compiled and edited a selection of Quimby's works into The Quimby Manuscripts (1921). In this work, Dresser re-opened the controversy concerning Quimby and Mary Baker Eddy, and her sources for developing Christian Science. He attacked Eddy in a chapter as well as in the appendix of the book. The work was heavily edited and highly selective, and Dresser chose to publish only what supported his and his parents' claims.

According to Ann Taves, "Dresser used the psychology of the subconscious to reinterpret the writings of Phineas Quimby and provide a unified theoretical foundation for the dissenting mind-cure groups under the banner of New Thought." He saw Christian Science and New Thought as linked together in what he called the "mind cure" movement, but disliked the public emphasis on Christian Science as opposed to what he saw as the "more rational" New Thought; so he wanted to link the origins of "mind cure" to Quimby. The complete writings of Quimby were later made available through Boston University, and Gillian Gill writes that they revealed "only general similarities" between Quimby's writings and Eddy's.

=== A History of the New Thought Movement ===
In 1919, Dresser wrote A History of the New Thought Movement, which aimed to present a history of the movement as an idealistic, spiritual faith system. Although highly influential, the work was "intensely partisan and repetitive", and Dresser's position in New England and his preoccupation with the Quimby controversy led to a distortion of the movement's history, in which he mostly ignored the importance of the Chicago based Emma Curtis Hopkins in favor of Quimby.

== Personal life ==
Dresser married Alice Mae Reed in 1898.

He died March 30, 1954, in Boston, Massachusetts.

== Bibliography ==
=== Books ===
- The Power of Silence, 1895.
- The Perfect Whole: An Essay on the Conduct and Meaning of Life, 1896.
- Education and the Philosophical Ideal, 1900.
- A Book of Secrets with Studies in the Art of Self Control, 1907.
- A Physician to the Soul, 1908.
- A History of the New Thought Movement, 1919.
- The Open Vision: A Study of Psychic Phenomena, 1920.
- The Quimby Manuscripts, 1921.
- A History of Ancient and Medieval Philosophy, Thomas Y. Crowell Company, 1926.
- Outlines of the Psychology of Religion, Thomas Y. Crowell Company, 1929.

=== Booklets ===
- God is Love. 1906
- A Law of Human Evolution. 1905
