= 1830 =

1830 in various calendars
- Gregorian calendar: 1830; MDCCCXXX
- Ab urbe condita: 2583
- Armenian calendar: 1279; ԹՎ ՌՄՀԹ
- Assyrian calendar: 6580
- Balinese saka calendar: 1751–1752
- Bengali calendar: 1236–1237
- Berber calendar: 2780
- British Regnal year: 10 Geo. 4 – 1 Will. 4
- Buddhist calendar: 2374
- Burmese calendar: 1192
- Byzantine calendar: 7338–7339
- Chinese calendar: 己丑年 (Earth Ox); 4527 or 4320 — to — 庚寅年 (Metal Tiger); 4528 or 4321
- Coptic calendar: 1546–1547
- Discordian calendar: 2996
- Ethiopian calendar: 1822–1823
- Hebrew calendar: 5590–5591
- Hindu calendars
- Vikram Samvat: 1886–1887
- Shaka Samvat: 1751–1752
- Kali Yuga: 4930–4931
- Holocene calendar: 11830
- Igbo calendar: 830–831
- Iranian calendar: 1208–1209
- Islamic calendar: 1245–1246
- Japanese calendar: Bunsei 13 / Tenpō 1 (天保元年)
- Javanese calendar: 1757–1758
- Julian calendar: Gregorian minus 12 days
- Korean calendar: 4163
- Minguo calendar: 82 before ROC 民前82年
- Nanakshahi calendar: 362
- Thai solar calendar: 2372–2373
- Tibetan calendar: ས་མོ་གླང་ལོ་ (female Earth-Ox); 1956 or 1575 or 803 — to — ལྕགས་ཕོ་སྟག་ལོ་ (male Iron-Tiger); 1957 or 1576 or 804

July 27: The July Revolution starts in France and overthrows King Charles X.

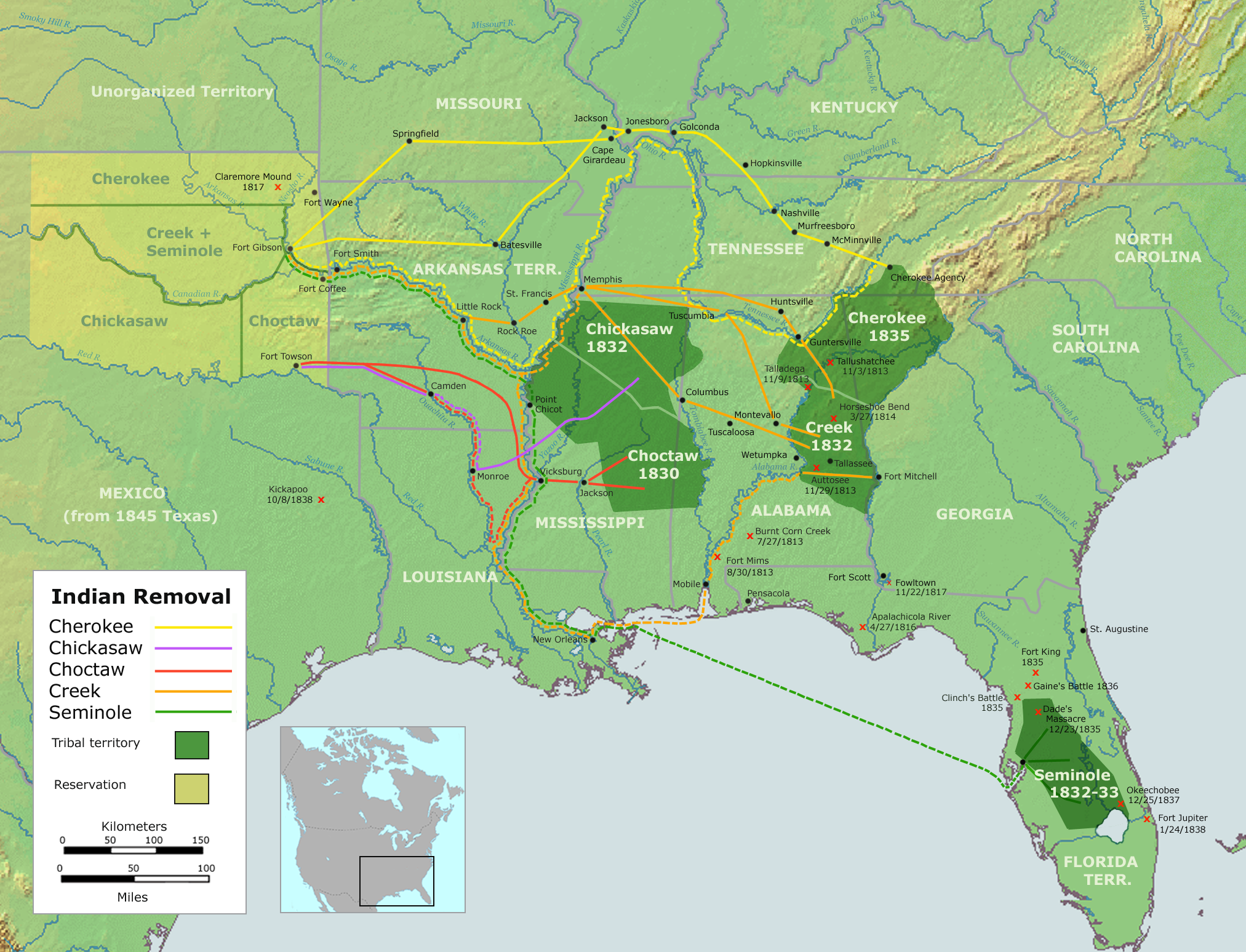
May 28: U.S. government relocation of thousands of Native Americans begins with signing of the Indian Removal Act.

1830 (MDCCCXXX) was a common year starting on Friday of the Gregorian calendar and a common year starting on Wednesday of the Julian calendar, the 1830th year of the Common Era (CE) and Anno Domini (AD) designations, the 830th year of the 2nd millennium, the 30th year of the 19th century, and the 1st year of the 1830s decade. As of the start of 1830, the Gregorian calendar was 12 days ahead of the Julian calendar, which remained in localized use until 1923.

It is known in European history as a rather tumultuous year with the Revolutions of 1830 in France, Belgium, Poland, Switzerland and Italy.

== Events ==
=== January–March ===
- January 11 – LaGrange College (later the University of North Alabama) begins operation, becoming the first publicly chartered college in Alabama.
- January 12–27 – Webster–Hayne debate: In the United States Congress, Robert Y. Hayne of South Carolina debates against Daniel Webster of Massachusetts about the question of states' rights vs. federal authority.
- February 3 – The London Protocol establishes the full independence and sovereignty of Greece from the Ottoman Empire, as the result of the Greek War of Independence.
- February 5 – A fire destroys the Argyll Rooms in London, where the Philharmonic Society of London presents concerts, but firefighters are able to prevent its further spread by use of their new equipment, steam-powered fire engines.
- March 26 – The Book of Mormon, subtitled "An Account Written by the Hand of Mormon, Upon Plates Taken from the Plates of Nephi", is first published, with E. B. Grandin printing the original edition in Palmyra, New York.
- March 28 – The Java War ends with the capture of Prince Diponegoro during negotiations with Dutch commander Hendrik Merkus de Kock.

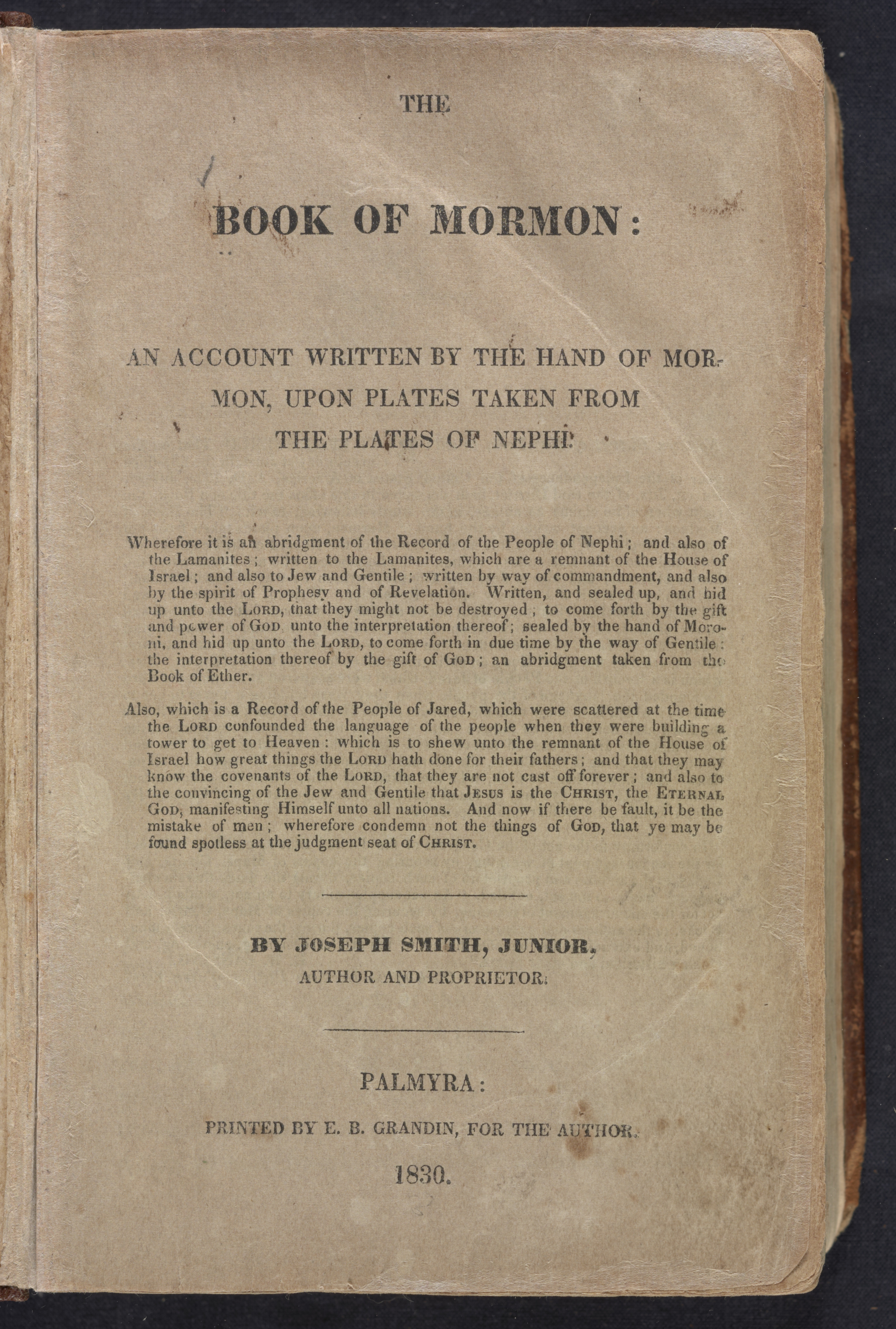
March 26: The Book of Mormon is first published, 11 days before the Church of Latter Day Saints is formally organized.

=== April–June ===
- April 6 – Joseph Smith and five others organize the Church of Christ (later renamed the Church of Jesus Christ of Latter Day Saints), the first formally organized church of the Latter Day Saint movement, in northwestern New York.
- May 13 – Ecuador separates from Gran Colombia.
- May 15 – The Royal Swedish Yacht Club (KSSS) is founded.
- May 28 – The Indian Removal Act is signed into law by U.S. President Andrew Jackson, beginning the "Trail of Tears" with the forced relocation of more than 60,000 Indigenous Americans from the Cherokee, Muscogee (Creek), Seminole, Chickasaw, and Choctaw nations from the southeastern United States to what is now the U.S. state of Oklahoma. The relocation is accomplished by the end of 1838. In addition to the five tribes, thousands of Indian-owned black slaves are moved as well, and the move has the effect of beginning mass destruction of bison in North America.
- June 12 – 7.5 magnitude earthquake kills more than 7,400 people in the Chinese province of Hebei.
- June 26 – William IV succeeds his brother George IV, as King of the United Kingdom.

=== July–September ===
- July 5 – French invasion of Algiers, leading to creation of French Algeria.
- July 13 – The General Assembly's Institution (later the Scottish Church College), one of the pioneering institutions that ushers in the Bengali Renaissance, is founded by Alexander Duff and Raja Ram Mohan Roy, in Calcutta, India.
- July 17 – Barthélemy Thimonnier is granted a French patent (#7454) for a sewing machine: it chain stitches at 200/minute.
- July 18 – Uruguay adopts its first constitution.
- July 20 – Greece grants citizenship to Romaniote Jews.
- July 26 – The July Revolution in France begins when people in Paris rebel against the July Ordinances, issued earlier in the day at Saint-Cloud by King Charles X of France.
- July 27 – "The Three Glorious Days" of the July Revolution in France begin. The Paris mob clashes with the National Guard: over the period 1,800 rioters and 300 soldiers will die.
- July 29 – "The Three Glorious Days" of the July Revolution in France end with establishment of a provisional government in Paris.
- July 31 – King Charles X of France flees to the Château de Rambouillet.
- August 2 – King Charles X abdicates the throne in favour of his grandson Henri, Count of Chambord, who never takes the throne.
- August 9 – Louis Philippe, the "Citizen King", becomes King of the French.
- August 13 – The Duc de Broglie is appointed Prime Minister of France by Louis Philippe.
- August 25 – The Belgian Revolution begins in Brussels with revolts against King William I of the Netherlands.
- August 31 – Edwin Beard Budding is granted an English patent for the invention of the lawn mower.
- September 15 – The opening of the Liverpool and Manchester Railway, the world's first intercity passenger railway operated solely by steam locomotives, takes place in England, UK.
- September 26 – Belgian Revolution: The army of the United Kingdom of the Netherlands fails to retake Brussels; a National Congress is summoned to draw up a Constitution and a Provisional Government of Belgium is established under Charles Latour Rogier.

=== October–December ===
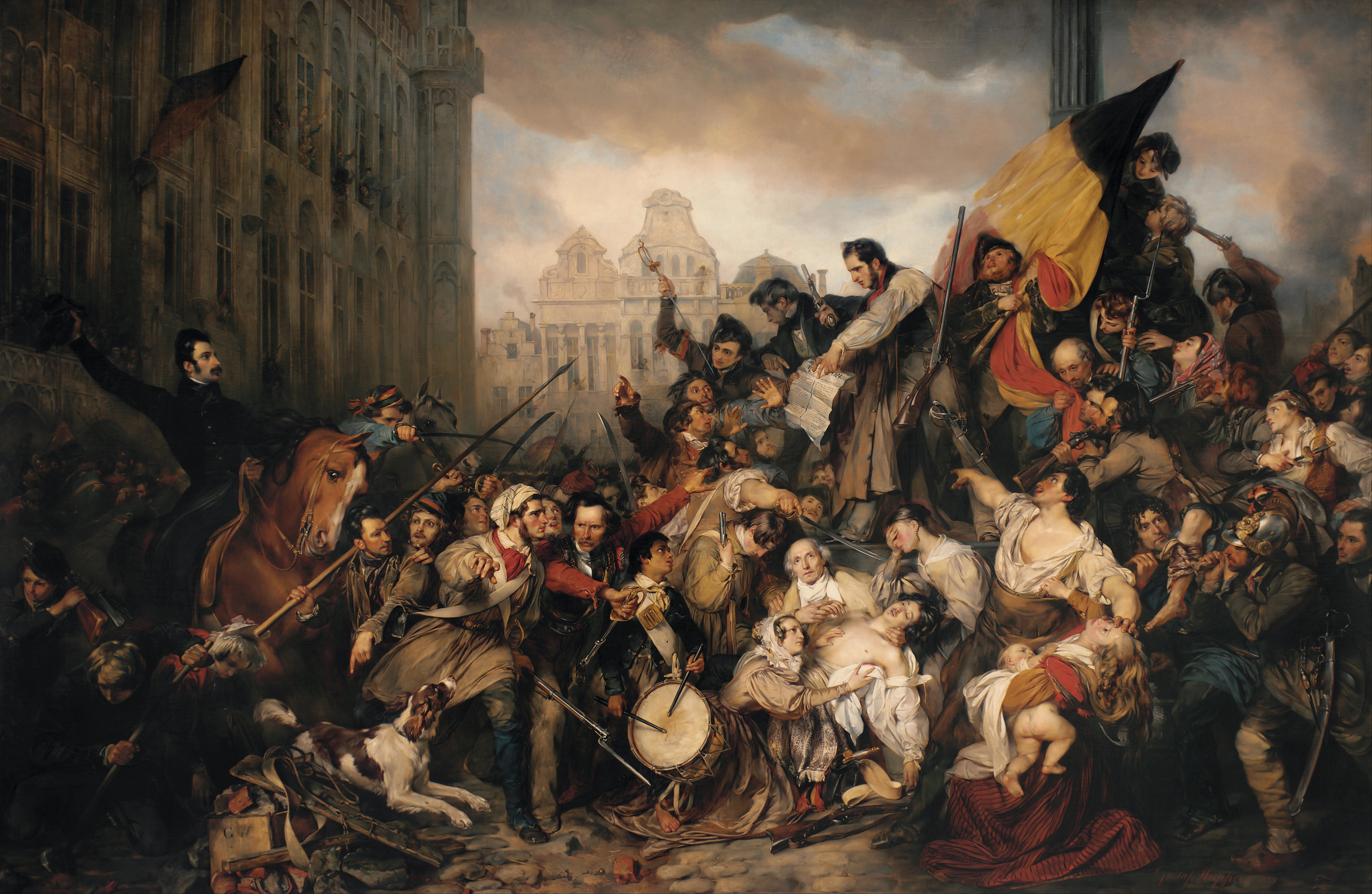
October 4: French-speaking and Flemish-speaking residents secede from the southern Netherlands to create Belgium.

- October 4 – Belgian Revolution: The Provisional Government in Brussels declares the creation of the independent state of Belgium.
- October 20 – Thomas Cochrane is granted a patent for the first airlock.
- October – The Regeneration in Switzerland begins: more liberal constitutions are adopted in most cantons.
- November 2 – Jacques Laffitte succeeds the Duc de Broglie as Prime Minister of France.
- November 8 – Ferdinand II becomes King of the Two Sicilies.
- November 22
  - The Whig Charles Grey, 2nd Earl Grey succeeds Arthur Wellesley, 1st Duke of Wellington, as Prime Minister of the United Kingdom.
  - On what becomes called "the Ustertag", men of the Canton of Zürich in Switzerland gather to demand a new constitution.
- November 29 – The Polish November Uprising begins in Warsaw against Russian rule.
- December 5 – Hector Berlioz's most famous work, Symphonie fantastique, has its world premiere in Paris.
- December 20 – The independence of Belgium is recognized by the Great Powers.

=== Date unknown ===
- 10,000 chests of opium are sold in China.
- Austins of Derry is established in Northern Ireland. Until closure in 2016, it is the world's oldest independent department store.
- Sogo, a Japanese department store brand founded in Osaka, Japan, as predecessor part of Seven & I Retail Group.
- The Entuzjastki society is founded in Poland.
- The Glyptothek museum of classical sculpture, commissioned by King Ludwig I of Bavaria, is opened as Munich's first public museum.

== Births ==
=== January–June ===
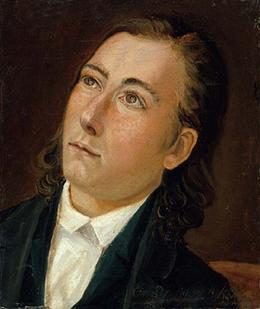
Lars Hertervig

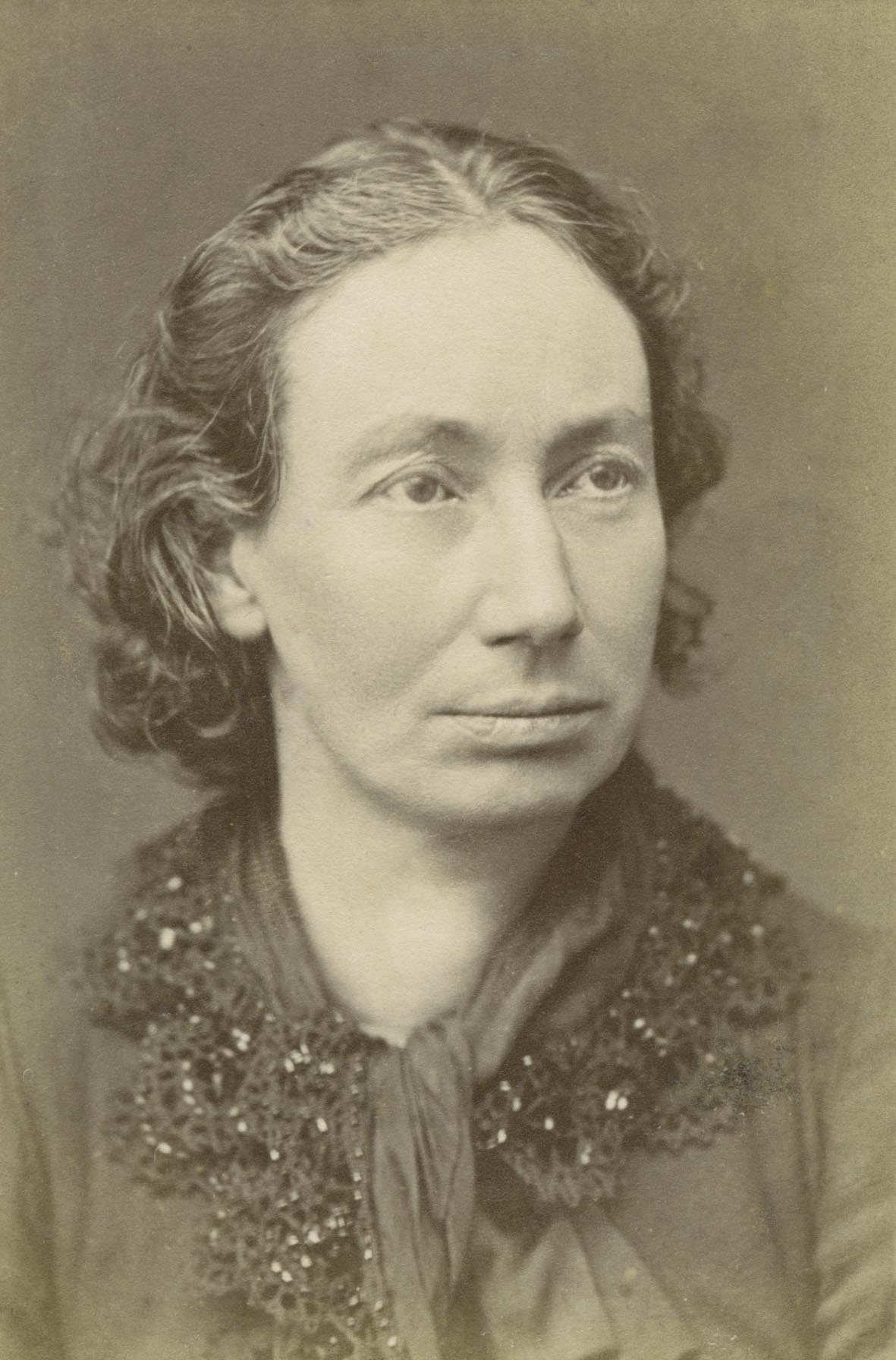
Louise Michel

- January 7 – Albert Bierstadt, German-American painter (d. 1902)
- January 8 – Hans von Bülow, German conductor, pianist and composer (d. 1894)
- January 21 – Liu Kunyi, Chinese general (d. 1902)
- January 23 – Gaston, Marquis de Galliffet, French general (d. 1909)
- January 31 – James G. Blaine, 28th and 31st United States Secretary of State (d. 1893)
- February 3 – Robert Gascoyne-Cecil, 3rd Marquess of Salisbury, Prime Minister of the United Kingdom (d. 1903)
- February 8 – Abdülaziz, Ottoman Sultan (d. 1876)
- February 16 – Lars Hertervig, Norwegian painter (d. 1902)
- March 15 – Paul Heyse, German writer, Nobel Prize laureate (d. 1914)
- March 21 – Friedrich von Beck-Rzikowsky, Austrian general (d. 1920)
- March 26 – Dewitt Clinton Senter, American politician, 18th Governor of Tennessee (d. 1898)
- May 5 – John Batterson Stetson, American hat maker (d. 1906)
- May 9 – Harriet Lane, Acting First Lady of the United States (d. 1903)
- May 10 – François-Marie Raoult, French chemist (d. 1901)
- May 14 – Antonio Annetto Caruana, Maltese archaeologist, author (d. 1905)
- May 29 – Louise Michel, French anarchist (d. 1905)
- April 9 – Eadweard Muybridge, English photographer, pioneer of photographic studies of motion (d. 1904)
- April 21 – Clémence Royer, French anthropologist (d. 1902)
- June 1 – Martha Hooper Blackler Kalopothakes, American missionary, journalist, translator (d. 1871)
- June 5 – Carmine Crocco, Italian brigand (d. 1905)
- June 22 – Theodor Leschetizky, Polish pianist, professor and composer (d. 1915)

=== July–December ===
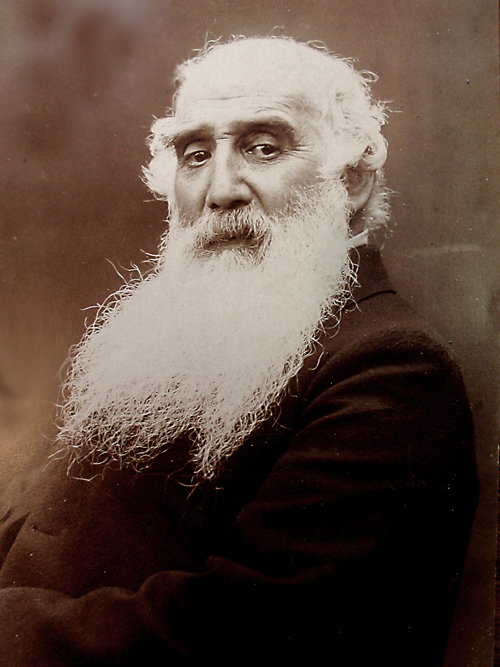
Camille Pissarro

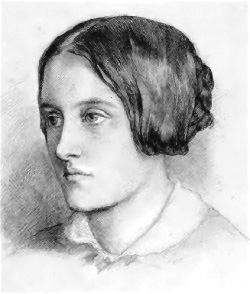
Christina Rossetti

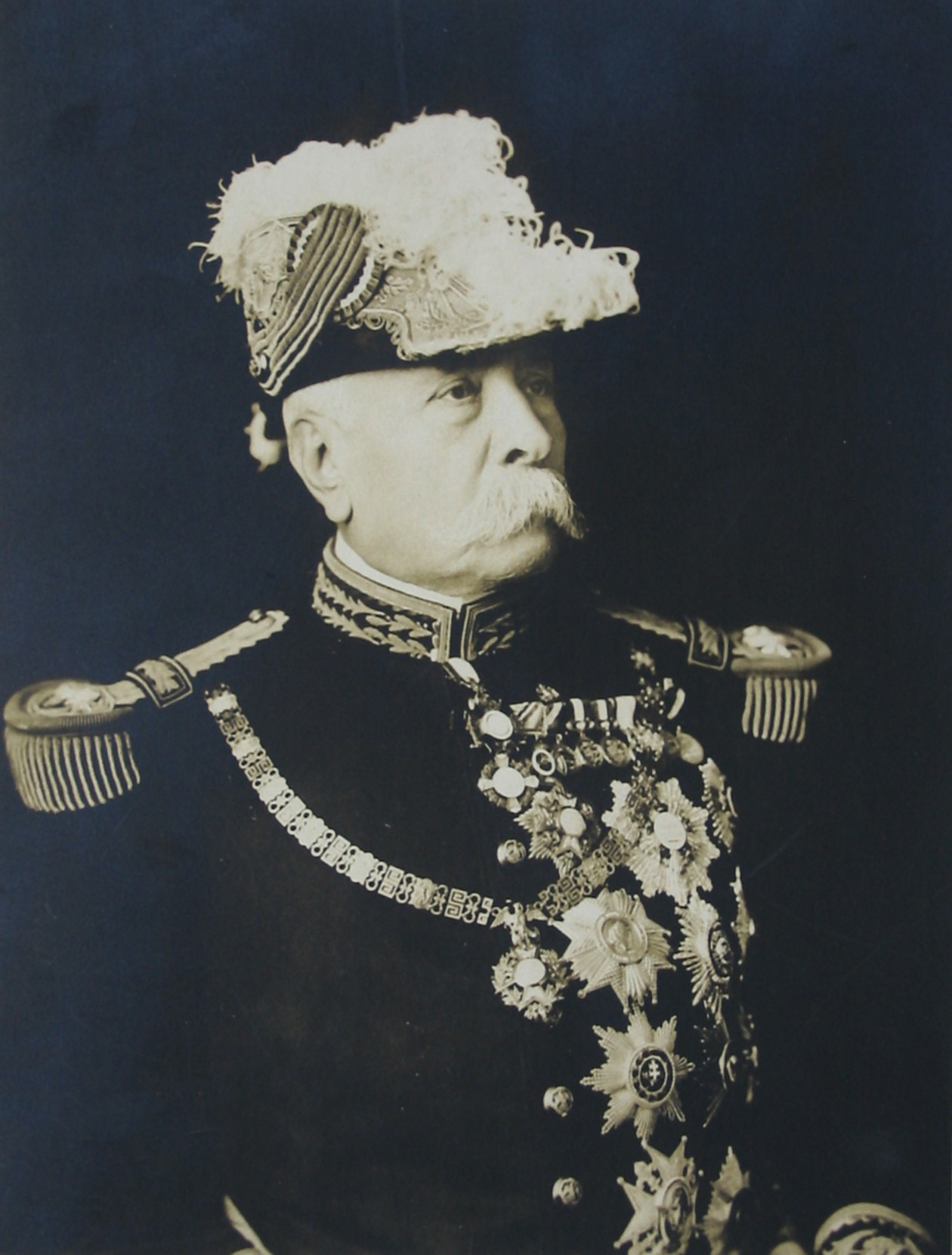
Porfirio Diaz

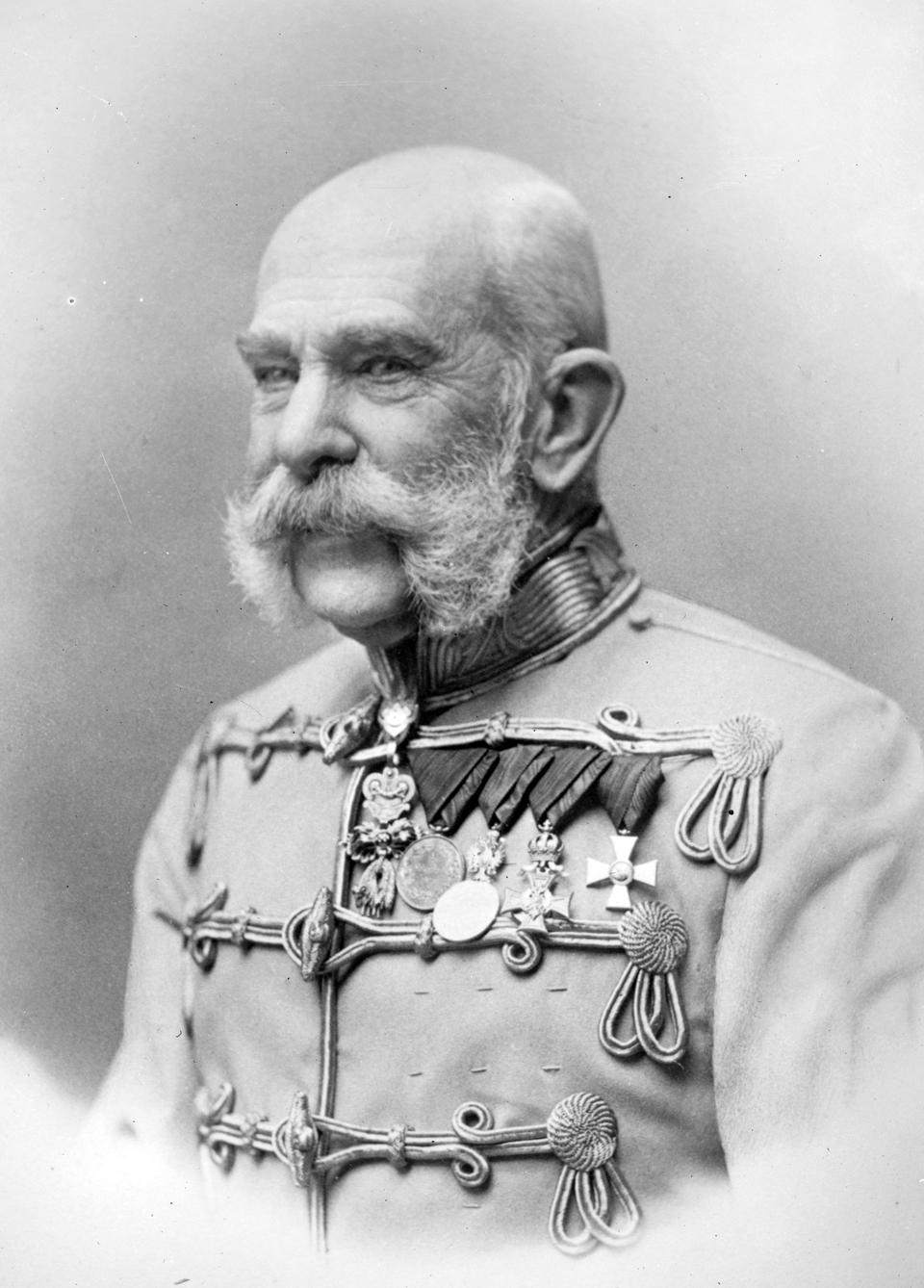
Franz Joseph I of Austria

- July 8 – Frederick W. Seward, American politician (d. 1915)
- July 10 – Camille Pissarro, French painter (d. 1903)
- July 20 – Clements Markham, English explorer (d. 1916)
- July 21 – John H. Lewis, American politician (d. 1929)
- July 22 – William Sooy Smith, American civil engineer and general (d. 1916)
- July 25 – John Jacob Bausch, German-American optician who co-founded Bausch & Lomb (d. 1926)
- August 18 – Emperor Franz Joseph I of Austria (d. 1916)
- August 26 – Daniel Webster Jones, American Latter-day Saint pioneer (d. 1915)
- September 2 – William P. Frye, American politician (d. 1911)
- September 8 – Frédéric Mistral, French writer, Nobel Prize laureate (d. 1914)
- September 12 – William Sprague IV, American politician from Rhode Island (d. 1915)
- September 15 – Porfirio Díaz, 29th President of Mexico (d. 1915)
- September 17 – Maria Theresia Bonzel, German Roman Catholic nun and saint (d. 1905)
- September 20 – Sir Edward Reed, British naval architect, author, politician, and railroad magnate (d. 1906)
- September 22 – Caroline Webster Schermerhorn Astor, prominent American socialite (d. 1908)
- October 10 – Queen Isabella II of Spain (d. 1904)
- November 7 – Emanuele Luigi Galizia, Maltese architect, civil engineer (d. 1907)
- November 8 – Oliver Otis Howard, American Civil War general (d. 1909)
- December 5 – Christina Rossetti, English poet (d. 1894)
- December 10 – Emily Dickinson, American poet (d. 1886)
- December 16 – Kálmán Tisza, 9th Prime Minister of Hungary (d. 1902)
- December 17 – Jules de Goncourt, French writer (d. 1870)
- December 19 – Susan Huntington Gilbert Dickinson, American writer and publisher (d. 1913)
- December 21 – Bartolomé Masó, Cuban patriot (d. 1907)

=== Date unknown ===
- Robert Abbott, Australian politician (d. 1901)
- Mary Hunt, American activist (d. 1906)
- Charles D. F. Phillips, British medical doctor (d. 1904)
- Su Sanniang, Chinese rebel (d. 1854)

== Deaths ==
=== January–June ===
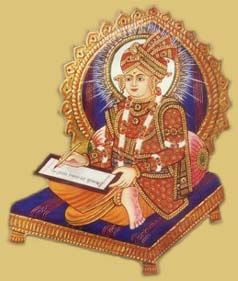
Swaminarayan

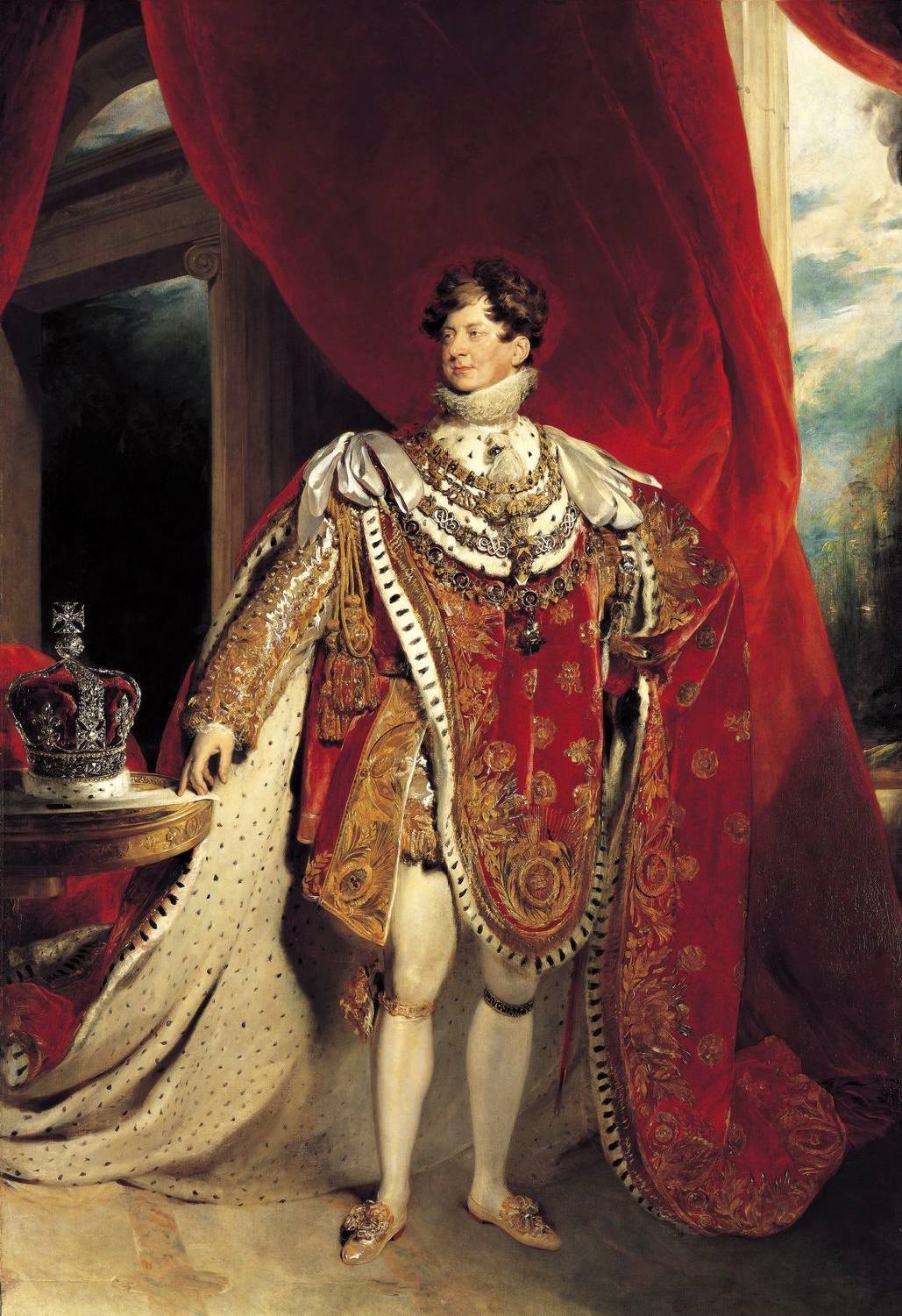
George IV

- January 7
  - Thomas Lawrence, English painter (b. 1769)
  - John Campbell, Australian public servant and politician (b. 1770)
  - Carlota Joaquina of Spain, Queen consort of Portugal (b. 1775)
- January 19 – Johann Schweighäuser, German classical scholar (b. 1742)
- January 25 – Benito de Soto, Galician pirate, executed (b. 1805)
- January 26 – Filippo Castagna, Maltese politician (b. 1765)
- February 2 – Manoel da Costa Ataíde, Brazilian painter (b. 1762)
- February 22 – William Badger, master shipbuilder (b. 1752)
- February 23 – Jean-Pierre Norblin de La Gourdaine (Jan Piotr Norblin), French-born Polish painter (b. 1740)
- March 2 – Samuel Thomas von Sömmerring, German physician, anatomist (b. 1755)
- March 7 – Jacques Villeré, first Creole governor of Louisiana (b. 1761)
- March 16 – Sir Robert Farquhar, British merchant, colonial governor and politician (b. 1776)
- March 17 – Laurent de Gouvion Saint-Cyr, French marshal (b. 1764)
- April 14 – Erike Kirstine Kolstad, Norwegian actress (b. 1792)
- June 1 – Swaminarayan (Sahajanand Swami), Indian yogi, central figure in Swaminarayan Hinduism (b. 1781)
- June 4 – Antonio José de Sucre, Venezuelan revolutionary leader, statesman (b. 1795)
- June 26 – King George IV of the United Kingdom (b. 1762)

=== July–December ===
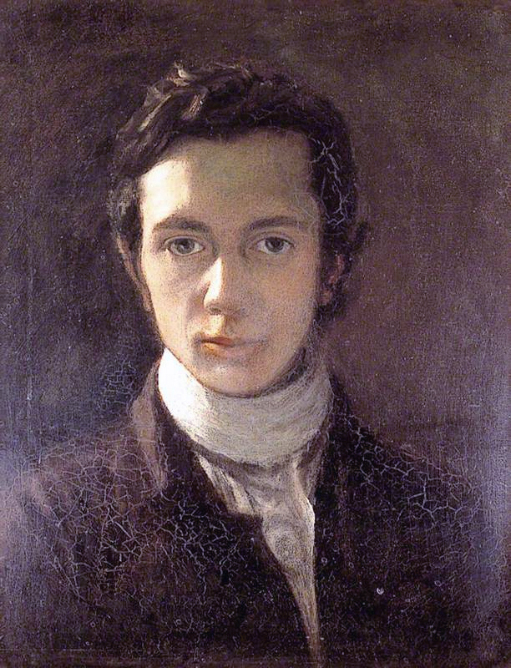
William Hazlitt

- August 6 – David Walker, African-American abolitionist (b. 1796)
- August 24 – Louis Pierre Vieillot, French ornithologist (b. 1748)
- September 18 – William Hazlitt, English essayist (b. 1778)
- September 23
  - Alice Flowerdew, British teacher, poet, and hymnwriter, (b. 1759)
  - Elizabeth Monroe, First Lady of the United States (b. 1768)
- October 4 – Ludwig Yorck von Wartenburg, Prussian military leader (b. 1759)
- October 5 – Dinicu Golescu, Romanian writer (b. 1777)
- October 11 – José de La Mar, military leader, President of Peru (b. 1776)
- October 31 – Petar I Petrović-Njegoš, ruler of Montenegro (b. 1747)
- November 8 – Francis I of the Two Sicilies (b. 1777)
- November 18 – Adam Weishaupt, German philosopher (b. 1748)
- November 30 – Pope Pius VIII, Italian pontiff (b. 1761)
- December 6 – Morton Eden, 1st Baron Henley, British diplomat (b. 1752)
- December 8 – Benjamin Constant, Swiss writer (b. 1767)
- December 17 – Simón Bolívar, Venezuelan revolutionary leader, statesman (b. 1783)

=== Date unknown ===
- Temerl Bergson, Polish Jewish businesswoman, philanthropist
- Clelia Durazzo Grimaldi, Italian botanist (b. 1760)
