= Michał Bergson =

Polish musician (1820–1898)

Michał Bergson (Bergsohn), or Michel Bergson (20 May 1820 – 9 March 1898), was a Polish composer and pianist, promoter of Frédéric Chopin.

== Biography ==
Born in Warsaw, Poland, Bergson was the son of Gabriel Bereksohn, grandson of Berek and Temerl Bergson, and great-grandson of Samuel Zbytkower. His children included the influential French philosopher Henri Bergson and artist and occultist Moina Mathers, wife of Samuel Liddell MacGregor Mathers.

He learned from Friedrich Schneider, Carl Friedrich Rungenhagen, and Wilhelm Taubert and worked mainly in Italy and Switzerland. In 1863 Michal Bergson became professor at the Conservatory in Geneva, and later was its head. Bergson had by that time married (Note: In 1856.) a native of Yorkshire, Katherine Levison, they lived in London, England and France, finally settled there. He died in London.

== Compositions ==
- Luisa di Montfort (performed in 1847)
- 'Scene and Air' from Luisa di Montfort for clarinet and piano
- Salvator Rosa
- Qui va à la chasse, perd sa place (1859)
- Mazurka, Opp. 1 and 48
- Le Rhin, Op. 21
- 12 Études caractéristiques
- Concerto Symphonique pour piano avec orchestra, Op. 62 (performed 1868)
