= Temerl Bergson =

Polish Jewish businesswoman and patroness of the Polish Hassidic movement

- תמריל ברגסון
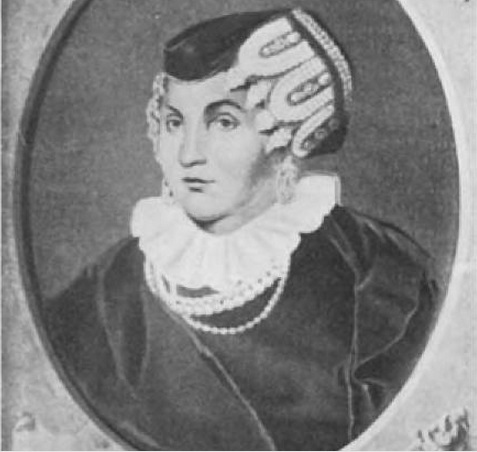
- Born: Tamar
- Died: 1830
- Other names: Temerl Sonnenberg; Temerl Berekson
- Known for: Patroness and benefactress of Polish Hasidic Jews
- Spouses: Jacob Jacobson; Berek Bergson
- Children: 6
- Parent: Avraham of Opoczno
- Relatives: Michał Bergson, Polish composer and pianist Henri Bergson, French philosopher

Temerl Bergson (also spelled Tamarel; Hebrew name Tamar; surname alternately Sonnenberg or Berekson; Hebrew: תמריל ברגסון, died 1830) was a Polish Jewish businesswoman. She was a supporter of Jews living in Warsaw and patroness of the Hasidic movement in Poland. She was renowned for her largesse in her philanthropy toward Polish Hasidic leaders and tzadikim, and was said to have "distributed money like ashes". Referred to as the "Doña Gracia of Hasidism", she is credited with the success of the Hasidic movement in Poland in the early 19th century.

== Early life and marriages ==
Temerl's father, Avraham of Opoczno, Poland, was said to be "learned and extremely wealthy". She had a sister who married Rabbi Moshe Simcha of Opoczno.

Temerl was married at a young age to Jacob Jacobson, a Warsaw merchant; they had one son, Hirsch, before Jacobson died. The young widow remarried in February 1787 to Dov (Berek) Sonnenberg (1764–1822) son of Shmuel Zbitkower. Berek changed his surname to Sonnenberg during the Prussian rule of Poland. Like his father Shmuel, a court Jew who amassed a fortune by supplying both the Polish and Russian armies during the Partitions of Poland in the late 18th century, Berek built up a personal fortune through his own government contracts. He gave generously to Jewish causes and was known as the "Rothschild of Polish Jewry".

While Berek engaged in general Jewish philanthropy, his wife Temerl directed the couple's efforts to support the Hasidic movement in Poland. Followers of Rabbi Yisroel Hopsztajn, the Maggid of Kozhnitz, they donated generously to Hasidic causes, took hundreds of Hasidic Jews into their employ, and made their home a meeting place for the movement's followers. In 1807, the couple built the first Hasidic synagogue and study hall in the Praga suburb of Warsaw. The couple was honored by the Hasidic leaders of their day with their attendance at their children's weddings; they also married their only daughter to a grandson of Shmelke of Nikolsburg.

== Business career ==
In this Land, a life that was mighty among princes
To her nation she was a protector against oppression – a helper during distress.
To the poor she was a mother
She was a virtuous woman, powerful and famous.

— Epitaph of Temerl Bergson

After Berek's death, Temerl took over his business interests and also founded a bank. She was one of the few Jews permitted to deal in real estate. In 1810 she had purchased a home in a street "technically forbidden to Jews", and was granted an exemption from the ghetto residence laws. In 1827 she received permission from the Russian tsar to buy the estate of Jerzy de Hesse-Darmstadt, making her only the third Jew in Poland permitted to own property beyond the ghetto walls.

Her support of Hasidic leaders and tzaddikim also continued after her husband's death. Several impoverished Hasidic leaders reportedly rebuffed her efforts to assist them, including Rabbi Yitzchak Meir Alter of Ger and Rabbi Menachem Mendel of Kotzk, but Rabbi Simcha Bunim of Peshischa and Rabbi Yitzchak of Vorka accepted her largesse. Temerl hired the latter two tzadikim to help manage her business interests.

Her philanthropy extended to non-Hasidic Polish Jews as well; she was praised by one mitnagid (Jewish opponent of Hasidism) as "the Polish Hasidah". In 1818 she contributed close to 54,000 rubles to a Warsaw community charity, and left 300,000 złotys in her will to another local charity supporting the poor.

She used her standing to influence the authorities to favor the Hasidim during the "anti-Hasidic investigations" of 1824 that were promulgated by members of the Haskalah (Jewish Enlightenment). In one instance, she helped rescind an official order barring Hasidim from visiting the tzadikim by personally appealing to the governor of Warsaw. Hasidic leaders accorded Temerl the honorific Reb, a title traditionally given to men.

== Personal ==
Temerl and Berek Bergson were both religious Jews; despite his wealth and government connections, Berek retained his beard, payot, and traditional dress. The couple had four sons and one daughter. Their sons Jacob, Leopold, and Michael later adopted the name Berekson (son of Berek).

Among the descendants of Temerl and Berek Bergson were Joseph Bergson (1812–?), an instructor in medicine at the University of Warsaw; Michał Bergson (1820–1898), a Polish composer and pianist; and Henri Bergson (1859–1941), a leading French philosopher and winner of the Nobel Prize in Literature.

== Legacy ==
Her tombstone states: “In this Land, a life that was mighty among princes / To her nation she was a protector against oppression—a helper during distress. / To the poor she was a mother. / She was a virtuous woman, powerful and famous.”
