= Native American slave ownership =

Ownership of enslaved Africans and Native Americans by Native Americans

Native American slave ownership refers to the ownership of enslaved people by Native Americans from the colonial period to the American Civil War. Waves of European colonization (and the concurrent Atlantic slave trade) brought enslaved Africans to North America. Following this development many indigenous tribes began to acquire Africans as slaves. Many prominent people from the "Five Civilized Tribes" purchased slaves from their white neighbors and became members of the planter class.

The 1863 Emancipation Proclamation only applied to States in rebellion, and did not legally affect slavery in Native American areas that fought for the Confederate States of America. All slaves in the United States were legally emancipated upon the ratification of the 13th Amendment on December 6, 1865, just after the American Civil War. In practice, slavery continued in some Native American territories. The federal government negotiated new treaties with the "Five Civilized Tribes" in 1866, in which they agreed to end slavery.

== Background ==
Holding humans in slavery was not a new concept to indigenous American peoples - in inter-Native American conflict tribes often kept prisoners-of-war, and these captives often replaced slain tribe-members. Intra-indigenous slavery also occurred in the Pacific Northwest and in Alaska, where it persisted until the late-19th century. Because prior to European contact, Native American practices of slavery largely arose from such inter-tribal conflict (rather than from purely economic exploitation) indigenous perspectives on the enslavement of Africans differed from more industrial European paradigms of slavery.

However, not all Indians slaves became slaves via warfare: an indigenous person could gamble away the rights to his own person, and thus become the slave of another Indian, or they could inherit enslavement, and thus be born slaves.

African Americans and Native Americans have interacted for centuries. The earliest record of Native American and African contact occurred in April 1502, when Spanish colonists transported the first Africans to Hispaniola to be held and work in slavery. Some scholars argue that because of similarities between some African and Native American cultural artifacts, the two groups likely had transatlantic encounters before European discovery of the Americas - this has not however been proved. Regardless, by the 18th century, the holding of Africans in slavery by and with Native Americans became substantial in colonial America.

Native Americans and Africans had many interactions as parallel oppressed communities. Before the jump-start of the Atlantic slave trade, some European settlers enslaved many Native Americans, and major European-held colonies such as Virginia and South Carolina enslaved thousands (30,000-53,000) of Native Americans in the late 1600s through the 1700s with the occurrence of enslavement continuing into the 1800s.

Andrés Reséndez estimates that between 147,000 and 340,000 Native Americans were enslaved in North America, excluding Mexico. According to the National Park Service, "Native Americans, during the transitional period of Africans becoming the primary race enslaved, were enslaved at the same time and shared a common experience of enslavement. They worked together, lived together in communal quarters, produced collective recipes for food, shared herbal remedies, myths and legends, and in the end they intermarried." Because of a shortage of men due to warfare, many tribes encouraged marriage between the two groups, to create stronger, healthier children from the unions.

However, Europeans considered both races inferior and made efforts to make both Native Americans and Africans enemies. Because of European fears of a unified revolt of Native Americans and African Americans, the colonists encouraged hostility between the ethnic groups: "Whites sought to convince Native Americans that African Americans worked against their best interests." In 1751, South Carolina law stated:

"The carrying of Negroes among the Indians has all along been thought detrimental, as an intimacy ought to be avoided."

In addition, in 1758 the governor of South Carolina James Glen wrote:

it has always been the policy of this government to create an aversion in them Indians to Negroes.

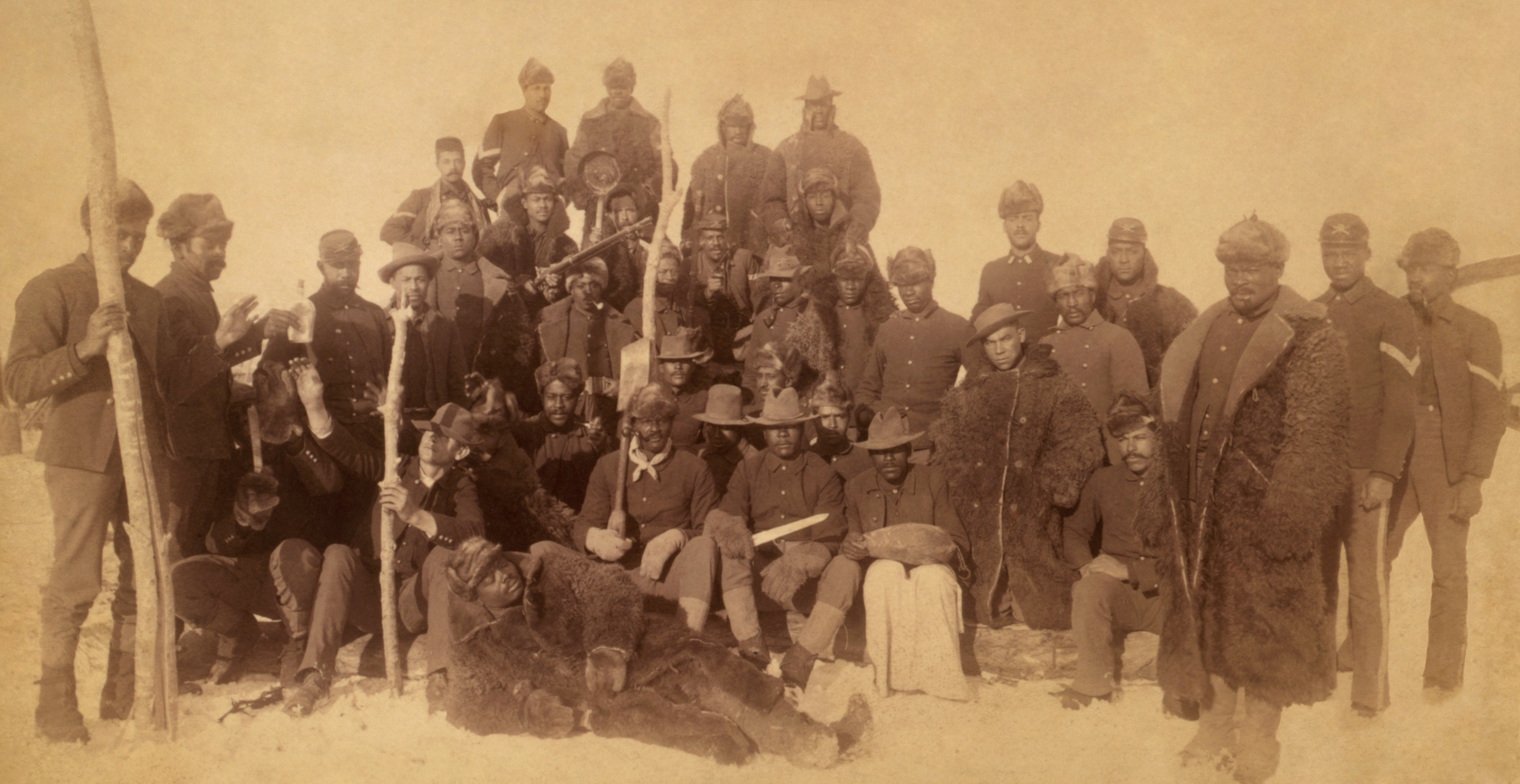
Buffalo Soldiers, 1890. The nickname was given to the "Black Cavalry" by the Native American tribes they fought.

Even though the native Indians kept and worked black slaves, sometimes Native Americans resented the presence of African Americans. The "Catawaba tribe in 1752 showed great anger and bitter resentment when an African American came among them as a trader." To gain favor with Europeans, the Cherokee exhibited the strongest color-prejudice of all Native Americans.

Native Americans were rewarded if they returned people who had escaped from slavery, and African-Americans were rewarded for fighting in the late 19th-century Indian Wars.

Africans held in slavery replaced Native American enslavement and eventually many Native Americans were pushed off their land and forced to move westward. There are many examples of this forced removal, but one of the most famous was the Trail of Tears (1830s and 1840s) that forced people of the Cherokee nation and other tribes to move to present-day Oklahoma. The Cherokee took their black slaves on the Trail, or shipped their slaves by boat.

=== Indian slavers of Indians ===
Large-scale indian slaving with modern weapons —in which Indians would raid other Indians to capture slaves— took place for around a century, from about 1620 to 1720. The main slavers were the Occaneechees, Westos, Chiscas, Chickasaws, and Iroquois; these have been defined as “militaristic slaving societies". Their territory was Eastern North America. The consequences of their slave raiding included “widespread dislocation, migration, amalgamation, and, in some cases, extinction of Native peoples”.

The Comanche and a few other Indian nations are considered “slave societies” with slaves constituting over 20% of the population, comparable to Rome, Greece, Portuguese America, and others.

=== Indian enslavement of Europeans during the era of European colonial rule ===
Records of Indian enslavement of Europeans begin in 1528.

== Enslavement of people of African origin ==
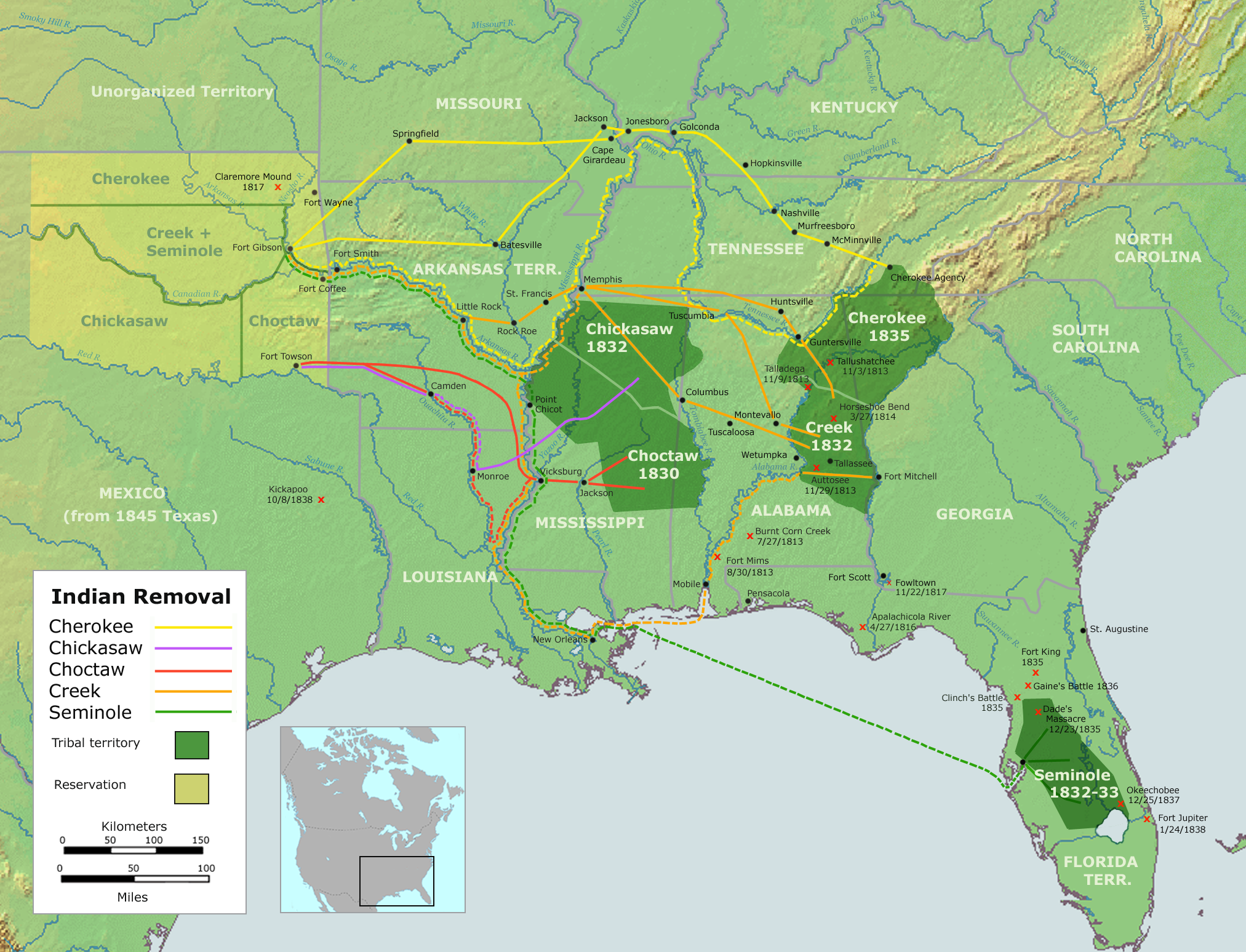
A map illustrating the relative territorial locations of the "Five Civilized Tribes" in 19th century North America. Represented are the Seminole, the Cherokee, the Creek, the Chickasaw and the Choctaw

Indigenous Indians created well-structured networks to trade black slaves among themselves and with the colonists. There are conflicting theories as to what caused the shift between traditional Native American servitude, to the oppressive racialized enslavement adopted by the Five Civilized tribes. One theory is the civilized tribes adopted slavery as means to defend themselves from federal pressure, believing that it would help them maintain their southern lands. In this effort to avoid removal, some Native American tribes attempted to assimilate into white European society through strategies such as formal schooling, adopting Christianity, moving off the reservation, or even owning slaves. They were the most receptive to white pressures to adopt European cultures.

In the nineteenth century, European Americans began to migrate west from the coastal areas, and encroach on tribal lands, sometimes in violation of existing treaties. Bands along the frontier, in closer contact with traders and settlers, tended to become more assimilated, often led by chiefs who believed they needed to change to accommodate a new society; indeed, some chiefs were mixed-race and were related to elected American officials. Other chiefs had been educated in American schools, and had learned American language and culture.

Educated individuals mixed with European heritage were the most likely to become slaveholders and adopt other European practices. Others of their people, often located at more of a distance, held to more traditional practices, and such cultural divisions were the cause of conflict, for instance the Creek Wars (1812–1813) and similar tensions suffered by other Southeast tribes.

Another narrative postulates that Native Americans began to feed into the European belief that Africans were somehow inferior to whites and themselves. Some indigenous nations such as the Chickasaws and the Choctaws began to embrace the concept that African bodies were property, and equated blackness to hereditary inferiority. In either case "The system of racial classification and hierarchy took shape as Europeans and Euro-Americans sought to subordinate and exploit Native Americans' and Africans' land, bodies, and labor. Whether strategically or racially motivated the trade of humans promoted interactions between the "Five Civilized Tribes" and Africans held in slavery which led to new power relations among Native societies, elevating groups such as the Five Civilized Tribes to power and serving, ironically, to preserve native order.

The writer William Loren Katz suggests that Native Americans treated the people they held in slavery better than European Americans in the Southeast. Travelers reported enslaved Africans "in as good circumstances as their masters." A white Indian Agent, Douglas Cooper, upset by the Native Americans failure to practice a harsher form of bondage, insisted that Native Americans invite white men to live in their villages and "control matters." One observer in the early 1840s wrote, "The full-blood Indian rarely works himself and but few of them make their slaves work. A slave among wild Indians is almost as free as his owner." Frederick Douglass stated in 1850, "the slave finds more of the milk of human kindness in the bosom of the savage Indian, than in the heart of his Christian master. But references to indigenous peoples' kindness were generally to the sanctuary offered by underground railroads operated by non-slaveholding Native Americans -- not to Native Americans who kept people in slavery.

In contrast to whites who profited from keeping people enslaved for labor, Native Americans who enslaved people didn't use justifications for slavery nor maintain a fictional view of seeing the enslaved people they held captive as part of the family. However, the status of enslaved individuals could change if captors adopted or married an enslaved African American, but enslaved people as a whole had always been linked to their lack of kin ties. In the 18th century, many Native American women married freed or runaway African men due to a decrease in the population of men in Native American villages. Records show that many Native American women "bought" captive African men but, unknown to the European sellers, the women freed and married the men into their tribe. When African men married or had children by a Native American woman, their children were born free, because the mother was free (according to the principle of partus sequitur ventrum, which the colonists incorporated into law.)

In the 1790s, Benjamin Hawkins was assigned as the US agent to the southeastern tribes. He encouraged the major Southeast tribes to adopt chattel slavery in order to have labor for plantations and large-scale agricultural production, as part of their assimilation of European-American ways. He thought their traditional form of slavery, which had looser conditions, was less efficient than chattel slavery. However, the adoption and adaptation of Euro-American institutions did nothing to shield Native Americans from U.S. domination and created divisions within the tribes themselves. The pressures from European Americans and the U.S government to assimilate as well as the economic shift of furs and deerskins led to them adopting an economy based on agriculture.

Katz thought that enslaving humans for profit contributed to divisiveness among tribes of the Southeast and promoted a class hierarchy based on "white blood." Some historians believe that class division was related more to the fact that several of the leadership clans accepted mixed-race chiefs, who were first and foremost on these tribes, and promoting assimilation or accommodation. The Choctaw and Chickasaw nations were also exceptions to the Cherokee, Creek, and Seminole nations; as these tribes abolished slavery immediately after the end of the Civil War the Chickasaw and Choctaw didn't free all of the people they held in slavery until 1866.

Tensions varied between African American and Native Americans in the south, as by the early 1800s sanctuary for people who escaped slavery changed. Sometimes people who had escaped slavery had a 50% chance that Native Americans may capture them and return them to the white people who enslaved them or even re-enslave them. Though some Native Americans had a strong dislike of slavery they lacked political power and a paternalist culture that pervaded the non-native south; as white men were seen as absolute masters in their households. It is unclear if Native American slaveholders sympathized with African American slaves as fellow people of color, class more than race may be a more useful prism through which to view masters of color.

Christianity emerged as an important fault line separating some Native Americans and African Americans as most African Americans by the early 1800s had accepted the teachings of missionaries while few Native Americans particularly the Choctaw and Chickasaw in the south converted and still practiced traditional spiritual beliefs. Many Native Americans saw the attempts of missionization as a part U.S. expansion.

European colonists often required the return of runaway slaves--people who escaped those who held them in slavery--to be included as a provision in treaties with Native Americans. In 1726, the governor of New York, William Burnet, exacted a promise from the Iroquois to return all people who had escaped their captors. In the mid-1760s, the colonial government of New York requested the Huron and Delaware to return those people who had managed to escape slavery, but there was no record of those people having been returned. Colonists placed ads about "runaway slaves".

While numerous tribes used captive enemies as servants and enslaved them, they also often adopted younger captives into their tribes to replace members who had died. In the Southeast, a few Native American tribes began to adopt a slavery system similar to that of the American colonists, paying to "own" and use captive African American people for profit, especially the Cherokee, Choctaw, and Creek. Though less than 3% of Native Americans kept others in slavery, divisions grew among the Native Americans over slavery. Among the Cherokee, records show that those in the tribe who held people in slavery were largely the children of European men that had shown their children the economics of slavery. As European colonists took the people they enslaved into frontier areas, there were more opportunities for relationships between African and Native American peoples.

Native Americans interacted with enslaved Africans and African Americans on many levels. Over time all the cultures interacted. Native Americans began slowly to adopt white culture. Native Americans in the South shared some experiences with Africans, especially during the period, primarily in the 17th and 18th centuries, when both were enslaved. The colonists along the Atlantic Coast had begun enslaving Native Americans to ensure a source of labor. At one time the trade of people held captive for profit was so extensive that it caused increasing tensions with the various Algonquian tribes, as well as the Iroquois Confederacy. Based in New York and Pennsylvania, they had threatened to attack colonists on behalf of the related Iroquoian Tuscarora before they migrated out of the South in the early 1700s.

In the 19th century, some members of these tribes who were more closely associated with settlers, began to purchase African-American slaves for workers. They adopted some European-American ways to benefit their people.

Among the Five Civilized Tribes, mixed-race slaveholders were generally part of an elite hierarchy, often based on their mothers' clan status, as the societies had matrilineal systems. As did Benjamin Hawkins, European fur traders and colonial officials tended to marry high-status women, in strategic alliances seen to benefit both sides. The women's sons gained their status from their mother's families; they were part of hereditary leadership lines who exercised power and accumulated personal wealth in their changing Native American societies. The chiefs of the tribes believed that some of the new generation of mixed-race, bilingual chiefs would lead their people into the future and be better able to adapt to new conditions influenced by European Americans. Slaveholding, as an element of such status-seeking, beyond merely securing direct wealth, was also intended to raise the stature of Five Civilized Tribes members with European colonizers in order assimilate and to avoid displacement by the Europeans (a strategy which ultimately failed).

Proposals for Indian Removal heightened the tensions of cultural changes, due to the increase in the number of mixed-race Native Americans in the South. Full bloods, who tended to live in areas less affected by colonial encroachment, generally worked to maintain traditional ways, including control of communal lands. While the traditional members often resented the sale of tribal lands to Anglo-Americans, by the 1830s they agreed it was not possible to go to war with the colonists on this issue.

=== Slavery in Native American Territory ===
With the US increasing pressure for Indian Removal, tensions became higher. Some chiefs believed removal was inevitable and wanted to negotiate the best terms possible to preserve tribal rights, such as the Choctaw Greenwood LeFlore. Others believed they should resist losing ancestral lands. For instance, members of the Cherokee Treaty Party, who believed removal was coming, negotiated cessions of land which the rest of the tribe repudiated.

This conflict was carried to Native American territory, where opponents assassinated some of the signatories of the land cession treaty, for alienating communal land. The tensions among the Native Americans of the Southeast was principally about land and assimilation rather than slavery. Most chiefs agreed that armed resistance was futile. The Five Civilized Tribes took African-Americans they held in slavery with them to Indian Territory (present-day Oklahoma) when they were removed from the American Southeast by the US Government.

Missionaries and supporters of the American Board vociferously denounced Indian removal as cruel, oppressive, and feared such actions would push Native Americans away from converting.

In 1850 the U.S. Fugitive Slave Law was adopted, further dividing Native Americans. The fate of runaway slaves in native territory was debated between Native Americans and the U.S. government. Many Native Americans felt U.S. lawmakers were overstepping their boundaries and overreaching federal authority in dictating the disposition of runaway slaves in indigenous lands.

Not all African Americans in Native American territory were held in slavery, as some were free.

For example the Choctaw Nation was home to diverse communities that included free African Americans as well as people of mixed African-Choctaw descent. In Native American territory such communities were frequent and this complicated census taking commissioned by the U.S. government. In 1832, U.S. census takers in Creek country struggled to categorize the diverse group of people who resided there; unsure how to count African American wives of Creek men, and how to classify people of mixed African-Native descent.

== The Five Civilized Tribes ==
The "Five Civilized Tribes", centered in Georgia, had acquired African Americans for use in slavery as plunder from Patriot slave owners during the Revolutionary War, which was allowed by their British allies. The Five Civilized Tribes, coached by Indian agent Benjamin Hawkins, acquired additional enslaved workers and became planters, like their white neighbors.

The federal government's expulsion of the Cherokee, Chickasaw, Choctaw, and Creek (Muscogee) tribes opened the door to the rapid growth of plantation slavery across the "Deep South", but Indian removal also pushed chattel slavery westward, setting the stage for more conflicts. Unlike other tribes that were physically forced to move out of the "Deep South" the government actively sought to have the Choctaw and Chickasaw nations forcefully unified governmentally. The Choctaw and Chickasaw saw each other as different people and were bitter enemies in the 1700s, but in 1837 a treaty was made unifying the two tribes.

The two tribes agreed to the union but a treaty made in 1855 allowed the two tribes to separate as different governments. Native Americans and African Americans had mostly positive interactions through the centuries. This positive interaction was not the case in post-Civil War Indian Territory. Racial antagonism, intensified by the abolition of slavery among the Five Civilized Tribes and the new pressures brought on by the influx of land-hungry white settlers, combined to create bitter hostility and in a few instances violent conflicts between the two peoples who had previously lived in relative harmony.

The evolution of this changing Native American and African American relationship can be traced to the American Civil War. President Lincoln's Emancipation Proclamation had a major impact on the Five Civilized Tribes even though the tribes were individually allowed to decide on the fate of their freedmen.

=== Cherokee ===
The Cherokee was the tribe that held the most people in slavery. In 1809, they held nearly 600 enslaved Africans. This number increased to almost 1,600 in 1835, and to around 4,000 by 1860, after they had removed to Indian Territory. Cherokee populations for these dates are: 12,400 in 1809; 16,400 in 1835; and 21,000 in 1860. The proportion of Cherokee families who held others in slavery did not exceed ten percent, and was comparable to the percentage among white families across the South, where an "elite" group of people held most of the people who were enslaved for labor and profit.

In the 1835 census, only eight percent of Cherokee households contained people in slavery, and only three Cherokee owned more than 50 people held in slavery. Joseph Vann had the most, owning 110 like other major planters. Of the Cherokee who held people in slavery, 83 percent held fewer than 10 people in slavery. Of the families who held people in slavery, 78 percent claimed some white ancestry.

In 1827 the Cherokee developed a constitution, which was part of their acculturation. It prohibited those held in slavery and their descendants (including mixed-race) from owning property, selling goods or produce to earn money, and marrying Cherokee or European Americans. It imposed heavy fines on those holding people in slavery if the people they enslaved consumed alcohol. No African Americans, even if free and of partial Cherokee heritage, could vote in the tribe. If a mother was of partial African descent, her children could not vote in the tribe, regardless of the father's heritage; the Cherokee also prohibited any person of Negro or mulatto parentage from holding an office in the Cherokee government.

Such laws reflected state slavery laws in the Southeast, but Cherokee laws did not impose as many restrictions on those enslaved nor were they strictly enforced. However the narrative that the Cherokee practiced a less harsh form of slavery has increasingly been challenged, with historians such as Dr. Arica L. Coleman going so far as to call it “demolished” by recent scholarship showing “slavery in the Indian Territory became a mirror-image of slavery in the White South." In the Cherokee constitution, the Cherokee council made strong efforts to regulate the marrying of Cherokee women to white men, but made little effort to control whom Cherokee men chose to marry or have a union with.

It was not uncommon for Cherokee men, like white men, to have unions with African-American women who were held in slavery, but there was little incentive for them to legalize the union as children born to captive enslaved women or any woman of African descent were not seen as Cherokee citizens at the time due to the rule of the Cherokee Constitution. Some sexual relationships between Cherokee men and African-American women were also informal, so prohibitions on marriage wouldn't affect them. The lack of legal prohibitions on such unions points to the unwillingness of lawmakers, many of whom belonged to families holding people in slavery, to infringe on the prerogatives of those who held people in slavery over the people they held captive or to constrain the sexual behavior of men in the tribe.

The Cherokee government in the majority of cases did not recognize marriages between African Americans and Cherokee citizens and declared people of African descent as forbidden marriage partners in an effort to discourage unions, and also to attempt to keep a divide between the two racial groups. Though a few cases on record indicate such unions did occur; in 1854 a Cherokee named Cricket was charged with taking a colored wife, and for unclear reasons the Cherokee courts tried him and acquitted him. It is speculated that maybe the court was attempting to express disapproval, the relationship may have been considered less formal, or etc.

The "1855 Act" made no room for formal relationships between African Americans and Cherokee citizens and was partially derived from the "1839 Act" preventing amalgamation with colored persons, which was still in effect but did not prevent such unions from occurring. By 1860 the population held in slavery in the Cherokee nation made up 18% of the entire population of the nation with most people enslaved being culturally Cherokee, only spoke the Cherokee language, and were immersed in Cherokee traditions. The Cherokee also had no laws on the manumission of those held in slavery; manumission was given for numerous reasons.

The Cherokee freed their slaves in 1863 in accordance to the Emancipation Proclamation; however, under the provisions of the post-war treaty only those freedmen and free African Americans residing in the Cherokee nation before the war and who remained in 1866 were declared citizens and entitled to vote and hold office. All other Cherokee freedmen wanting citizenship had to return to the nation within six months of the treaty signing.

Consequently, a number of former Cherokee slaves who had fled during the Civil War but returned after 1867 were not allowed Cherokee citizenship, and this category of non-citizen "intruders" often included husbands, wives, and children of Cherokee citizens. Some tribal leaders such as Chief Lewis Downing, made legislative attempts to correct this enumeration mistake, however the National Council and the Cherokee national legislature disregarded these measures and called on federal authorities to eject those categorized as "intruders".

=== Chickasaw ===
The Chickasaw also held similar laws mimicking the culture of the American south. After the Revolutionary War the Chickasaw like many other tribes were the targets of assimilation, they were pressed into giving up their trading of deerskins, and communal hunting grounds. The secretary of war Henry Knox under George Washington set two interrelated goals: peaceful land acquisitions and programs focused on assimilating Native Americans in the south. The Chickasaw became familiarized with chattel slavery through contact with European colonists, and began to adopt this form of slavery in the early 19th century.

The heavy decline of the white-tailed deer population aided in the pressure for the Chickasaw to begin enslaving people for labor as "chattel", the Chickasaw conceded that they could no longer rely primarily on hunting. It is unclear when the Chickasaw began to think of themselves as potential slave owners of African and African Americans as people they could enslave as property. The shift toward buying, selling, and exploiting slave labor for material gain accompanied broader, ongoing changes in the ways Chickasaw acquired and valued goods. The Chickasaw excelled in the production of cotton, corn, livestock, and poultry to not only feed their families, but to sell to American families.

U.S. Indian agents tracked Chickasaw acquisition of slaves and did not discourage it, as federal officials believed the exploiting of slave labor might enhance Native Americans' understandings of the dynamics of property ownership and commercial gain. The Chickasaw obtained many slaves born in Georgia, Tennessee, or Virginia . In 1790, Major John Doughty wrote to Henry Knox that Chickasaws owned a great many horses, and some families owned slaves and cattle. Among the Chickasaw who were slaveholders many had European heritage, mostly through a white father and a Chickasaw mother.

The continued assimilation came heavily through intermarriage as some assimilationists viewed intermarriage as another way to expedite natives' advancement toward civilization, and supported the underlying belief in white superiority. A number of Chickasaw with European heritage rose to prominence because they were related to already politically powerful members of the tribe, not because of racial makeup. Though the Chickasaw did not necessarily prize Euro-American ancestry they did embrace a racial hierarchy that degraded those with African heritage and associated it with enslavement.

A further cultural change among the Chickasaw was to have enslaved men work in the fields along with enslaved women; within the Chickasaw tribe, agricultural duties traditionally belonged to the women. Chickasaw legislators would later condemn sexual relationships between Chickasaw and black people; Chickasaws were punished for publicly taking up with blacks held in slavery with fines, whippings, and ultimately expulsion from the nation. This legislation was also an attempt to keep boundaries between race and citizenship within the tribe. The Chickasaw were also unique among the other civilized tribes as they saw their control over enslaved people as a particular form of power that could and should be enacted through violence. In some cases, the Chickasaw also practiced the separation of families, which was not practiced among the other tribes.

=== Choctaw ===
The Choctaw enslaved many people who were already enslaved in Georgia. The Choctaw held laws in their constitution which also mirrored the "Deep South". The Choctaw in Native American Territory did not allow anyone with African heritage to hold office even if they were of partial heritage. The Choctaw 1840 constitution also didn't allow freed African Americans to settle in the Choctaw nation meaning they were not allowed to own or obtain land, but white men could get permission in writing from the Chief or the United States Agent to reside in the Choctaw nation.

The Choctaw nation further barred those of partial African heritage from being recognized as Choctaw citizens, but a white man married to a Choctaw woman would be eligible for naturalization. In response to proslavery ideology in the Native American nations creating a climate of animosity toward free African Americans, the Choctaw General Council enacted legislation in October 1840 that mandated the expulsion of all free black people "unconnected with the Choctaw & Chickasaw blood" by March 1841. Those who remained were at risk of being sold at an auction and enslaved for life.

W.P.A. interviews conducted varied among formerly enslaved people of the Choctaw tribe, the formerly enslaved Edmond Flint asserted that his bondage by the Choctaw didn't differ from being enslaved under a white household, but indicated that within the Choctaw there were humane and inhumane enslavement. Choctaw who kept people in slavery and those who did not were a major focus for missionaries wanting to convert those who weren't Christian. One Methodist newspaper in 1829 stated,

What account will our people render to God if, through their neglect, this people, now ripe for the gospel, should be forced into the boundless wilds beyond the Mississippi, in their present state of ignorance?

The Choctaw did allow the people they enslaved to worship at Christian missions. For Africans rebuilding their religious lives in the Native American nations sustained a sense of connection to the kin and communities that had been left behind. Missionaries were able to establish mission churches and school in the Choctaw lands with permission from the tribe's leaders, but the issues of slavery created aversion between the Choctaw and the missionaries. The missionaries argued that human bondage didn't reflect a Christian society, and believed it highlighted native people's laziness, cruelty, and resistance to "civilization."

In the 1820s a heated debate over whether to allow slaveholding Choctaw into mission churches occurred, but a final decision was made with missionaries not wanting to alienate slaveholding Native Americans as potential converts and so received them at prayer meetings and granted church membership with the hope of enlightening them through discussion and prayer. During this time, missionaries did see Choctaws and African Americans as racially and intellectually inferior; converted Africans were regarded as intellectually and morally sounder than non-Christian Native Americans.

Cyrus Kingsbury, a leader of the American Board, believed that missionaries had brought civilization to the Choctaw whom he deemed as uncivilized people. A few Choctaw slaveholders believed that having their slaves learn how to read the Bible would cause them to become spoiled slaves, and this added to the persistent mistrust the Choctaw had for missionaries. One Choctaw slaveholder, Israel Folsom, informed Kingsbury that the Folsom family would no longer attend Kingsbury's church because of its antislavery position. Tiring of the missionaries condescending attitudes or questioning their pedagogical approach toward both Native American pupils and African worshippers, the Choctaw withdrew their children, slaves, and financial support from the mission schools and churches.

The Choctaw masters, whether they converted to Christianity or not, did not rely on religion as a weapon of control in interactions with their slaves, but did regulate where enslaved peoples could have religious gatherings. In 1850 the U.S. Congress made its most dramatic legislative move against free African Americans in the United States with its approval of the Fugitive Slave Act, which added to the tensions free African Americans felt in the Choctaw Nation. However, even with Choctaw lawmakers determined measures to separate the Choctaw from free African Americans, some free African Americans remained in the nation undisturbed.

In 1860 census takers from Arkansas documented several households in the Choctaw nation that were predominantly African American. The kidnappings of free African Americans by white men became a serious threat, even for those in Native American nations. Though paternalism sometimes motivated prominent Native Americans to protect freed black people, political leaders and enslavers generally viewed free African Americans as magnets for white thieves and thus a menace to people who kept slaves and national security.

In 1842 Choctaw Peter Pitchlynn wrote to the U.S. secretary of war, complaining about the "armed Texans" who charged into Choctaw country and kidnapped the Beams family; citing it as evidence of white American disregard for Native American sovereignty. The Beams family case went on from the 1830s to 1856 when the Choctaw court ruled that the family was indeed a free black family.

=== Creek ===
In Creek society before the arrival of Europeans and Africans in Creek country, those held in slavery were simply war captives. Noncombatant women and young children were enslaved and clans who had lost members on the battlefield took the captives into their extended matrilineal households and most of these "slaves" eventually became part of the family unit. When trade between Europeans began the Creek's traditional ways of determining a war captive's fate drastically changed, and the Creek began to sell them to Europeans. The best-known victims of the Creeks in the trade of enslaved people were the Apalachee tribe.

It is unclear when the Creek first met Sub-Saharan Africans; during the colonial period Creek people primarily encountered Africans as refugees seeking protection from the oppression of slavery, as employees or servants of deerskin traders, or as laborers for white settlers. For the Creeks, their most frequent contact with Africans came from day-to-day interactions with traders' slaves, but there were intermittent efforts by colonial and imperial authorities to limit the use of Africans in the deerskin trade though this policy was often ignored. White slaveholders attempted to deceive Africans held in slavery into believing the Creek would harm them to discourage them from trying to escape to the Creek.

The Creek often saw African men laboring at what was considered women's work in Creek culture; this reinforced the notion that African men were their inferiors, in the eyes of Creek warriors at least. Creeks could, and often did visit the plantations of the white men; sometimes the Creek only came to look around the plantations, sometimes the Creek brought deerskins and fresh meat to trade with white people. White people would often make the Africans they enslaved cross over into Creek territory even when the boundaries were known, and the Creek would often complain that white people were encroaching on their hunting grounds. These conflicts lead to the Creek attacking white settlements on Creek territory, and lead to the enslavement of white women and children whose bondate was mostly sold back to government authorities.

By the early 1700s the Creek began to have more interracial relationships with runaway slaves, and the purchase of African slaves lead to interracial relationships. This led to mixed race children and children born to a Creek mother were considered Creek regardless of the father's race. Prior to 1763 many slaves had hoped to find refuge in Native American communities, and in Georgia it didn't take slaves long to find Creek settlements. The obvious solution to this perceived threat was for white settlers from the Southern Colonies to reward Creek hunters for returning runaway slaves.

The Creek would sometimes return slaves to their white slaveholders, or enslave black men for themselves and absorb them into Creek society. The population of Africans and African Americans drastically increased in Creek society during the American revolution. Even after the American Revolutionary War the Americans tried to continue the same awards for runaway slaves. This system did not always work exactly as planned, since many Creeks, for a variety of reasons, were hesitant to force slaves to return to their former masters.

At times, traders and government officials attempted to capture runaway slaves who were seen "sculking" in various Creek towns which caused conflict between White Americans and the Creek. By the 1750s most traders living in the Creek country had at least one person in slavery. By the 1770s the far majority of Creeks didn't own black slaves. /> In 1860, about 30 years after their removal to Native American territory from their home in the Southeast, and Creek citizens kept 1,532 people in slavery (10 percent of their total population). /> Enslaved African Americans were allowed more freedom than their counterparts enslaved by white people.

Furthermore, enslaved blacks were not housed in separate villages or communities but lived in close contact with the Creek who held them captive, and were often used as interpreters speaking both Creek and English. Indian agent Benjamin Hawkins was very frustrated with the Creek because they wouldn't practice slavery as "chattel" slavery--managing enslaved people as work animals rather than enslaved humans--even when he introduced new techniques and tools. Mixed-blood Creek (those with European heritage) from mostly the Upper Creek that held their white parent's economic and social values, including patrilineal descent, and private land ownership; soon began to have major conflicts with traditionalists whom had slaves participate in the communal subsistence-level horticulture that reflected Creek culture rather than chattel slavery.

As a result, political upheaval, economic distress, and a spiritual awakening caused civil war among the Creeks in 1813 leading the Creek War, and soon after the Creek would be forced down the Trail of Tears. The Creek took the African Americans enslaved with them on the Trail of Tears into Indian Territory, and some Creek remained in Alabama, Georgia, and Florida resisting removal or assimilating into American culture. The only option for the Creek to be successful in the southern states was to become a white person culturally; those who refused to do so were either murdered, removed, or enslaved themselves.

=== Seminole ===
The Seminoles took a unique path compared to the other four civilized tribes. The Seminoles targeted and held African American in captivity, but did not codify racial slavery. Instead they kept to their traditions to absorb outsiders. Drawing on the chiefly political organization of their ancestors, Seminoles welcomed African Americans, but this increasingly isolated the Seminoles from the rest of the South and even from other Native Americans leading to them being seen as major threats to the plantation economy.

The Seminoles were also unique because they absorbed the remaining Yuchis population. African Americans who escaped their captors began to seek refuge in Florida with the Seminoles in the 1790s. One plantation owner in Florida, Jesse Dupont, declared that the people he held in captivity began to escape around 1791, when two men ran away to Seminole country he also stated:

An Indian Negro stole a wench and child and since she has been amongst the Indians she has had a Second.

Seminole country quickly became the new locus of black freedom in the region. While the other major Southern Native American nations began to pursue black slavery, political centralization and a new economy, Seminoles drew on culturally conservative elements of native culture and incorporated African Americans as valued members of their communities. Together, they created a new society, one that increasingly isolated them from other southerners. Seminole practice in Florida had acknowledged slavery, though not on the extremet form of "chattel" slavery then common in the American south. It was, in fact, more like feudal dependency and taxation since African Americans among the Seminole generally lived in their own communities. In exchange for paying an annual tribute of livestock and crops and hunting and war party obligations, black prisoners or enslaved people found sanctuary among the Seminole. Seminoles, in turn, acquired an important strategic ally.

Like other Southern Native Americans, Seminoles accumulated private property, and elites passed down enslaved African Americans and their descendants to relatives. The Seminoles maintained traditional captivity practices longer than other Native Americans, and continued to capture white Americans. The practice of capturing white Americans decreased in the early 19th century with the First Seminole War producing the regions last white captives. Though later to do so than other Native Americans in the south, Seminoles too narrowed their captivity practices. They grew pessimistic about incorporating non-natives into their families as adoptees and almost exclusively targeted people of African descent during their 19th century wars against American expansion.

When General Thomas Jesup enumerated the origins of African Americans among the Seminoles to the secretary of war in 1841, he began with "descendants of negroes taken from citizens of Georgia by the Creek confederacy in former wars." When a group of Seminole warriors pledged to join the British in the American Revolution, they stipulated that "Whatever horses or slaves or cattle we take we expect to be our own." Out of the sixty-eight documented captives in the Mikasuki War (1800-1802), 90% were African Americans. The Seminoles repeatedly took up arms to defend their land.

They fought in three major conflicts, the Patriot War, the First Seminole War, and the Second Seminole War and were in countless skirmishes with slave catchers. The Seminoles were at war with the United States far longer than other Southern Native American nations, the Seminoles continued to take black captives, and encouraged African Americans to join them in their fight against the invading Americans. The Seminoles continued to destroy and raid plantations.

Throughout 1836, Seminole warriors continued to best U.S. troops, but more alarming to white Americans was the relationship between Seminoles and African Americans. They feared that the alliance grew with each passing day, as the Seminoles captured slaves and enticed others to escape. After witnessing the unrest among Creeks forced to emigrate, General Thomas Jesup believed that the Second Seminole War could ignite the entire South in a general uprising, wherein people of color might destroy the region's plantation economy as well as their white oppressors.

The traditional relationship between Seminole blacks and natives changed following the Second Seminole War when the Seminole were relocated to settle on fixed lots of land and take up settled agriculture. Conflict arose in the Territory because the transplanted Seminole had been placed on land allocated to the Creek, who had a practice of chattel slavery. There was increasing pressure from both Creek and pro-Creek Seminole for the adoption of the Creek model of slavery for the Black Seminoles. Creek slavers and those from other native groups, and whites, began raiding the Black Seminole settlements to kidnap and enslave people. The Seminole leadership would become headed by a pro-Creek faction who supported the institution of chattel slavery. These threats led to many Black Seminoles escaping to Mexico.

== Responses ==
Tensions varied between African American and Native Americans in the south, as each nation dealt with the ideology behind the enslavement of Africans differently. In the late 1700s and 1800s, some Native American nations gave sanctuary to people who escaped enslavement while others were more likely to capture them and return them to their white captors or even re-enslave them. Others incorporated those who escaped into their societies, sometimes resulting in intermarriage between the Africans and the Native Americans, which was a commonplace among the Creek and Seminole.

Although some Native Americans had a strong dislike of slavery, because they too were seen as a people of a subordinate race than white men of European descent, they lacked the political power to influence the racialistic culture that pervaded the non-native South. It is unclear if Native Americans who held slaves sympathized with African Americans as fellow people of color; class, more than race, may be a more useful prism through which to view masters of color. Missionary work was an efficient method the United States used to persuade Native Americans to accept European methods of living.

Missionaries vociferously denounced Indian removal as cruel and oppressive, and feared such actions would push Native Americans away from converting. Some Native Americans who were against slavery saw the Civil War as an opportunity to ultimately end the institution. Prior to 1861 anti-slavery Creeks and Seminoles allowed people who escaped slavery from surrounding states to take refuge on their lands and some Cherokees maintained the Keetoowah Society, a secret abolitionist organization.

== Bibliography ==
- Ames, Kenneth M. (2001). "Slaves, chiefs and labour on the northern Northwest Coast". World Archaeology. The Archeology of Slavery. 33 (1). Taylor & Francis. doi:10.1080/00438240120047591. ISSN 0043-8243.
- Kars, Marjoleine (2020). Blood on the River. New York: The New Press. p. 362. ISBN 9781620974599.
- Palmié, Stephan, ed. (1995). Slave Cultures and the Cultures of Slavery (2nd. printing [1997], 1st. ed.). Knoxville: The University of Tennessee Press. p. 283.
- Snyder, Christina (2018). "6 - Native American Slavery in Global Context". In Noel Lenski; Catherine M. Cameron (eds.). What Is a Slave Society? The Practice of Slavery in Global Perspective. Cambridge University Press. doi:10.1017/9781316534908.007. ISBN 9781316534908.
