= Austins (department store) =

Former department store in Derry

Coordinates: 54.995°N 7.322°W

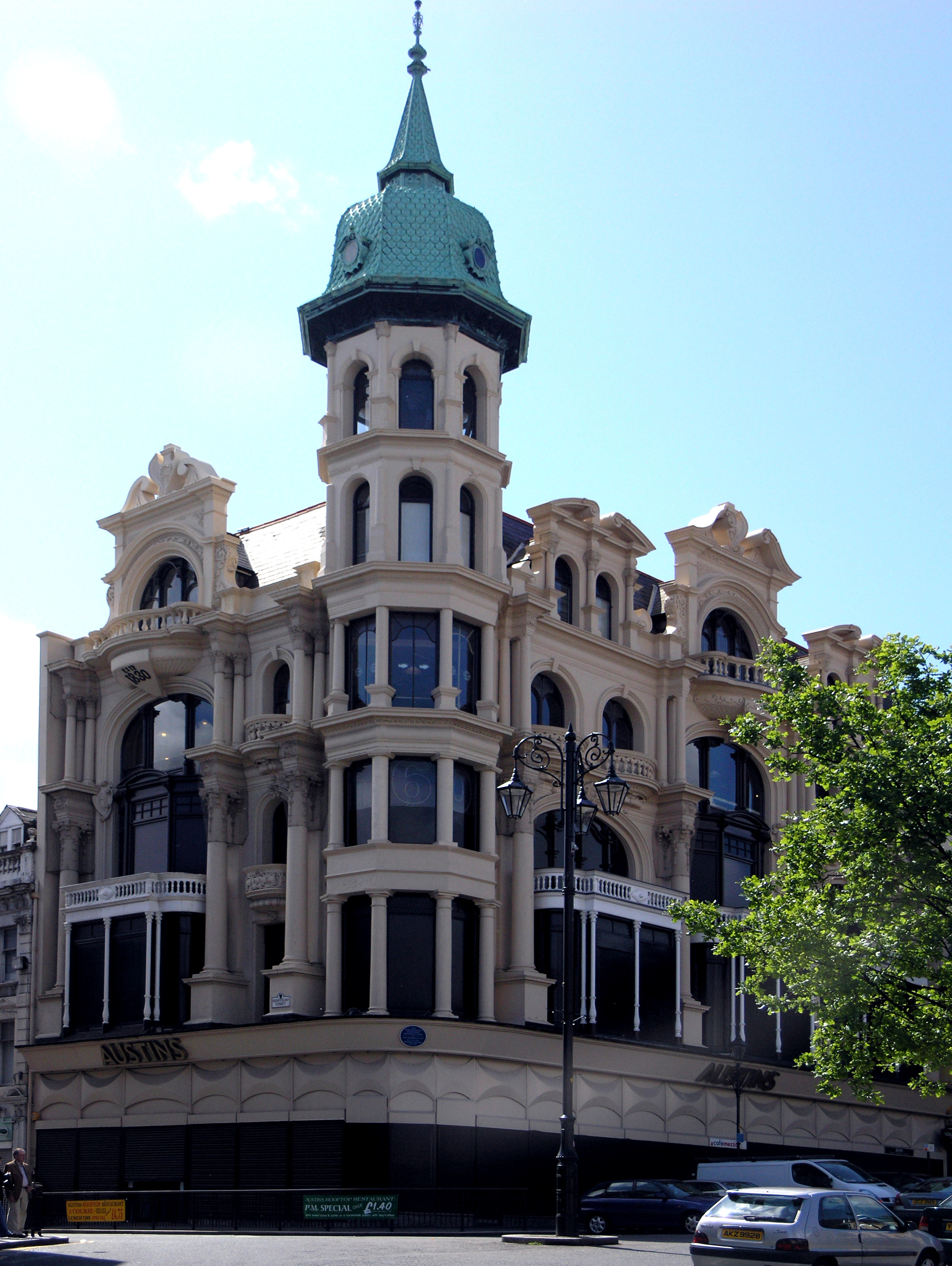
Austins department store, 2007

Austins was a department store in the Diamond area of Derry in Northern Ireland. Prior to its closure in 2016, it claimed to be the oldest department store in the world, although the original store, established in 1830, was modest in size.

== Architecture ==
After its building on the Diamond was destroyed by fire, the business commissioned purpose-built accommodation, one of Northern Ireland's more notable examples of Edwardian architecture. The building measures 25,000 square feet (2,300 m^{2}) and is five stories high. The architecture is Neo-Baroque with Art Nouveau influences in the fenestration. It was designed in 1906 by MA Robinson.

== Closure ==
The Austins Department store building in the Diamond was owned by the City Hotel Group, but the actual retail operation was leased to Hassonzender, which went into liquidation. The department store closed its doors to staff and the public without warning on 8 March 2016.

The liquidators state that the unforeseen costs of dealing with asbestos, and the disruption to trading this would have entailed, proved to be a stumbling block to attracting investment and this led to the sudden closure. Derry City Council officials raised the issue of dealing with the asbestos following the introduction of new regulations, in the Spring of 2015.

In March 2025, 9 years after it closed to the public and staff, the building was bought by Derry's Inner City Trust (ICT) for £1.2 million, which was funded by the Northern Ireland government in Stormont. The new owner indicated that it would begin restoration of the building. On 2 July 2025, it was announced by the Derry Journal that representatives of the Inner City Trust (ICT) were "hopeful" that they would have "good news" about the future development of Austins later in 2025.

There is no official re-opening date, or no confirmation that Austins will reopen as a department store again.
