= 1830 Cixian earthquake =

Earthquake in China

- Location within Hebei Location within China
- Local date: June 12, 1830
- Magnitude: M_{s} 7.5, M_{w} 7.4
- Epicenter: 36.4°N 114.2°E
- Fault: Tangshan–Heijian–Cixian Fault
- Type: Strike-slip
- Areas affected: Qing Dynasty
- Max. intensity: MMI X (Extreme)
- Casualties: 7,477 dead

The region of Zhili (modern day Hebei province) was struck by a major earthquake with an estimated magnitude of 7.5 M_{s} or 7.4 M_{w} on June 12, 1830. The epicentre was close to Cixian, which suffered the most severe damage. A total of 7,477 people died as a result of the earthquake.

== Tectonic setting ==
Cixian lies close to the western edge of the North China Basin, a rift basin that formed during the Eocene. Since the Pliocene, the active tectonics have been dominated by right-lateral strike-slip faulting. The two largest and most active of the fault zones are the Sanhe–Laishui Fault and the Tangshan–Heijian–Cixian Fault. The latter fault has been associated with many major historical earthquakes, including the 1976 Tangshan earthquake and the 1966 Xingtai earthquakes.

== Earthquake ==
Based on macroseismic data the earthquake had an estimated magnitude of 7.5 M_{s} or 7.4 M_{w}. The maximum perceived intensity reached X (extreme) on the Modified Mercalli scale. Surface rupture interpreted to be caused by this earthquake reached about 45 km in length. The earthquake is interpreted to have ruptured the southernmost segment of the Tangshan–Heijian–Cixian Fault.

== Damage ==
In Cixian, between 80 and 90% of all buildings collapsed and 200,000 houses were destroyed. In Pengcheng, part of a temple was the only building left standing. More than half the buildings in Cheng'an collapsed. Part of the city walls in Handan were destroyed as were many houses. Severe damage was also reported from Fengfeng, Linzhang, Anyang, Wu'an, Linxian, Tangyin, Huixian, Xiuwu, Xinxiang, Huojia, Shexian and Nanle.

There were widespread reports of ground fissuring and sandblows. The flow of some rivers and canals was affected. Landslides were reported near Pengcheng.

== Casualties ==
In Cixian 5,485 inhabitants were killed in the earthquake and a further 1,700 were killed or injured in Pengcheng. Deaths were also reported from Cheng'an (many), Handan and nearby villages (488). A total of 7,477 deaths was recorded.
