= Charles D. F. Phillips =

British medical doctor

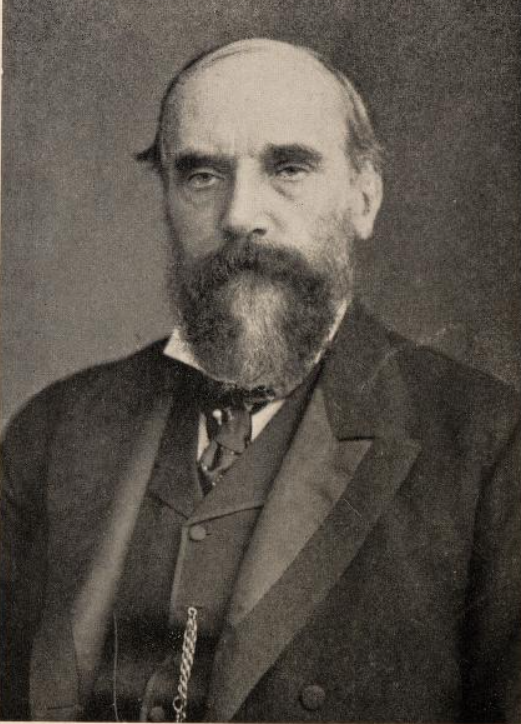
Charles D. F. Phillips

Charles Douglas Fergusson Phillips, F.R.C.S. (1830–1904) was a British medical doctor and author of a materia medica reference work, divided into two parts: organic (plant extracts, etc.) and inorganic substances (salts, acids, spas, etc.).

== Life and career ==
Charles D. F. Phillips was born in 1830, the fifth son of Captain R. Phillips of the 40th Regiment, a veteran of the Peninsular War and Waterloo. He studied medicine at Edinburgh and Marischal College, Aberdeen, where he graduated M.B. in 1852. He commenced practice in Manchester. He got his M.D. in 1859. It is believed that he first practiced as a homoeopath at Manchester, but he left the fold of Samuel Hahnemann and in 1867 moved to London, where for some years he earned a large professional income.

In 1878 he was disabled by a railway accident, for which, after much litigation, he was awarded damages to the amount of £16,000, said to be the largest sum ever given for injuries received. It was proved that he had made nearly £21,000 the year before the accident, and that for several years previously his professional income had been from £15,000 to £20,000. It took him several years of revalidation, before he was able to resume practice in 1883.

Dr. Phillips was for a considerable time Lecturer on Materia Medica and Therapeutics at the Westminster Hospital Medical School, and acted as examiner in the subject at the University of Aberdeen, Glasgow, and Edinburgh. He was the author of several works on pharmacology and therapeutics, some of which achieved considerable popularity. In his later years Dr. Phillips, who was a member of the Physiological Society, took a great interest in the exposure of the methods of the antivivisectionists. He was a Fellow of the Royal Society of Edinburgh, and an honorary LL.D. of Edinburgh and Aberdeen.

He retired from active practice about a year before his death, and was appointed Chairman of the Universities of Glasgow and Aberdeen Unionist Association, being invited to represent the joint Universities in Parliament, an honor which, however, he declined. He died in November 1904, just after publishing the third edition of his Materia Medica.

== Bibliography ==
The following works of Phillips were published:

- Materia Medica and Therapeutics: Vegetable Kingdom (first edition: 1874; second and last edition: 1886)
- Materia Medica, Pharmacology and Therapeutics: Inorganic Substances (first edition: 1882; third and last edition: 1904)
- The Physiological Action of Drugs: an Introduction to Practical Pharmacology (1901), co-authored with Dr. M. S. Pembery
- The Therapeutics of the Iron Compounds (1904)
- Collected Papers on Pharmacology and Therapeutics (published posthumously in 1908)
  - Antiseptics
  - Manganese and its Salts (on its toxicity and therapeutic uses)
  - Phosphorus and its Compounds (on its poisoning and therapeutics)
  - Chronic Lead Poisoning (on lead poisoning)
  - The Iodides (on 19th-century medical uses of iodide salts)
  - The Pharmacology of the Mercury Compounds (on mercury poisoning)
  - The Therapeutics of Mercury
  - The Action of the Lime Salts
  - Barium Salts
  - Oxygen, Ozone and Compressed Air
  - The Pharmacology of Strychnine (properties, action, and toxicity)
  - The Therapeutics of Strychnine
  - Berberine
  - Thuja
  - Curare
