= "Polish death camp" controversy =

Misnomer for concentration camps established and operated in Poland by Nazi Germany

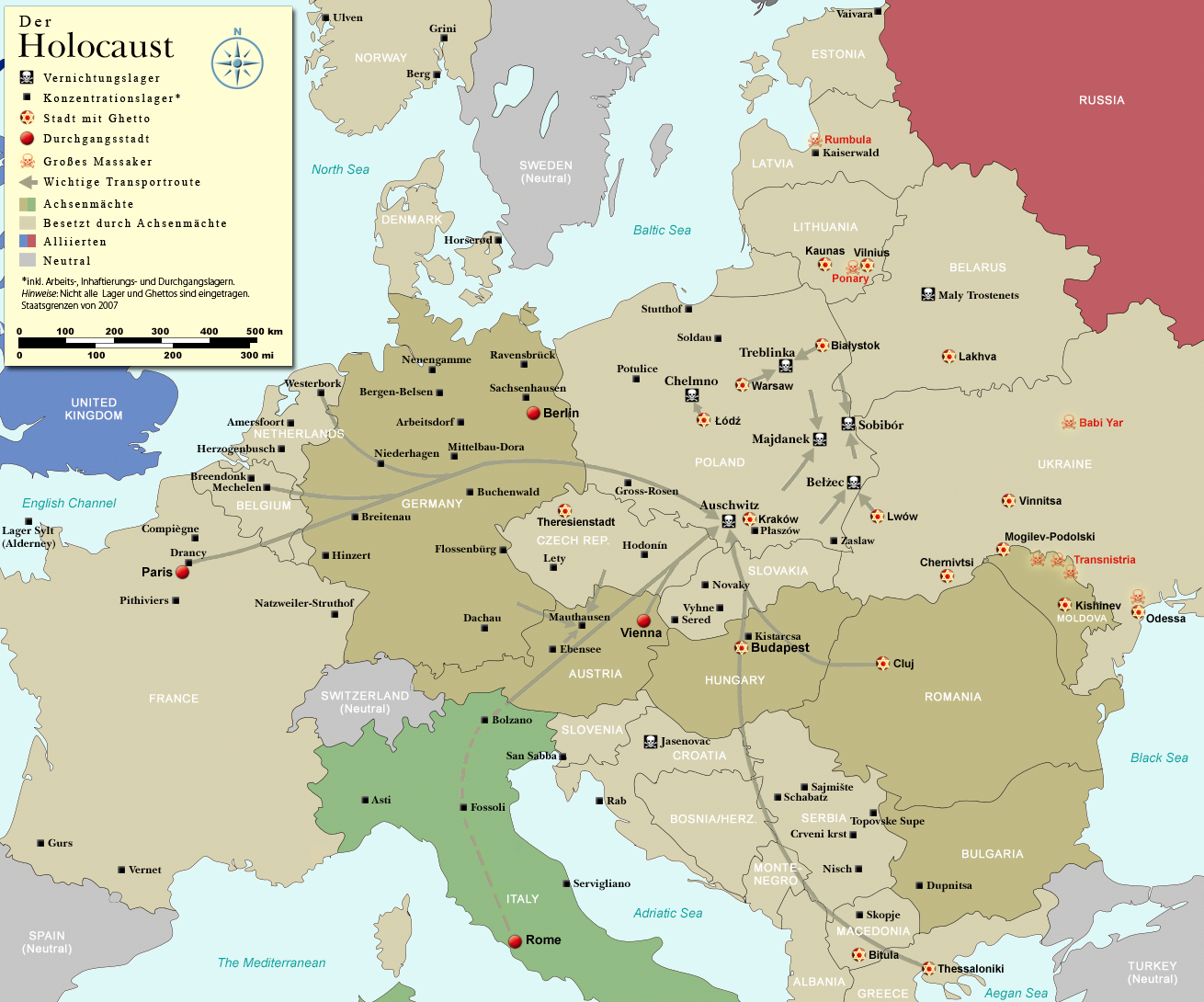
Nazi German concentration camps operated on now Polish territory. Germany also built concentration camps in Germany and elsewhere.

In historical discussions of World War II, "Polish death camp" and "Polish concentration camp" are ambiguous expressions which, while accurately describing the location of the camps in Poland, are misconstruable as indicating that these Nazi concentration and extermination camps—established by Nazi Germany in German-occupied Poland during World War II—were established or operated by Poles or by Poland.

Some Poles, including politicians, have viewed use of the expressions "Polish death camp" and "Polish concentration camp", by careless speakers, as having been deliberately intended to disinform.

Poland's subsequent 2018 Amendment to the Act on the Institute of National Remembrance prompted objections within and outside Poland. The law criminalized public statements ascribing, to the Polish nation, responsibility in Holocaust-related crimes, crimes against peace, crimes against humanity, or war crimes, or which "grossly reduce the responsibility of the actual perpetrators". It was generally understood that the law criminalized use of the expressions "Polish death camp" and "Polish concentration camp".

The amendment also prohibited use of the expression "Polish concentration camp" in reference to camps operated by the Polish government after World War II on sites of former Nazi camps. In a January 2018 trial, Newsweek.pl was sentenced for referring to the Zgoda camp, operated by Polish authorities between February and November 1945, as a "Polish concentration camp".

In 2019 Poland's Constitutional Tribunal ruled that the portions of the amendment relating to the expressions "Ukrainian nationalists" and "Eastern Lesser Poland" were null and void.

== Historical context ==
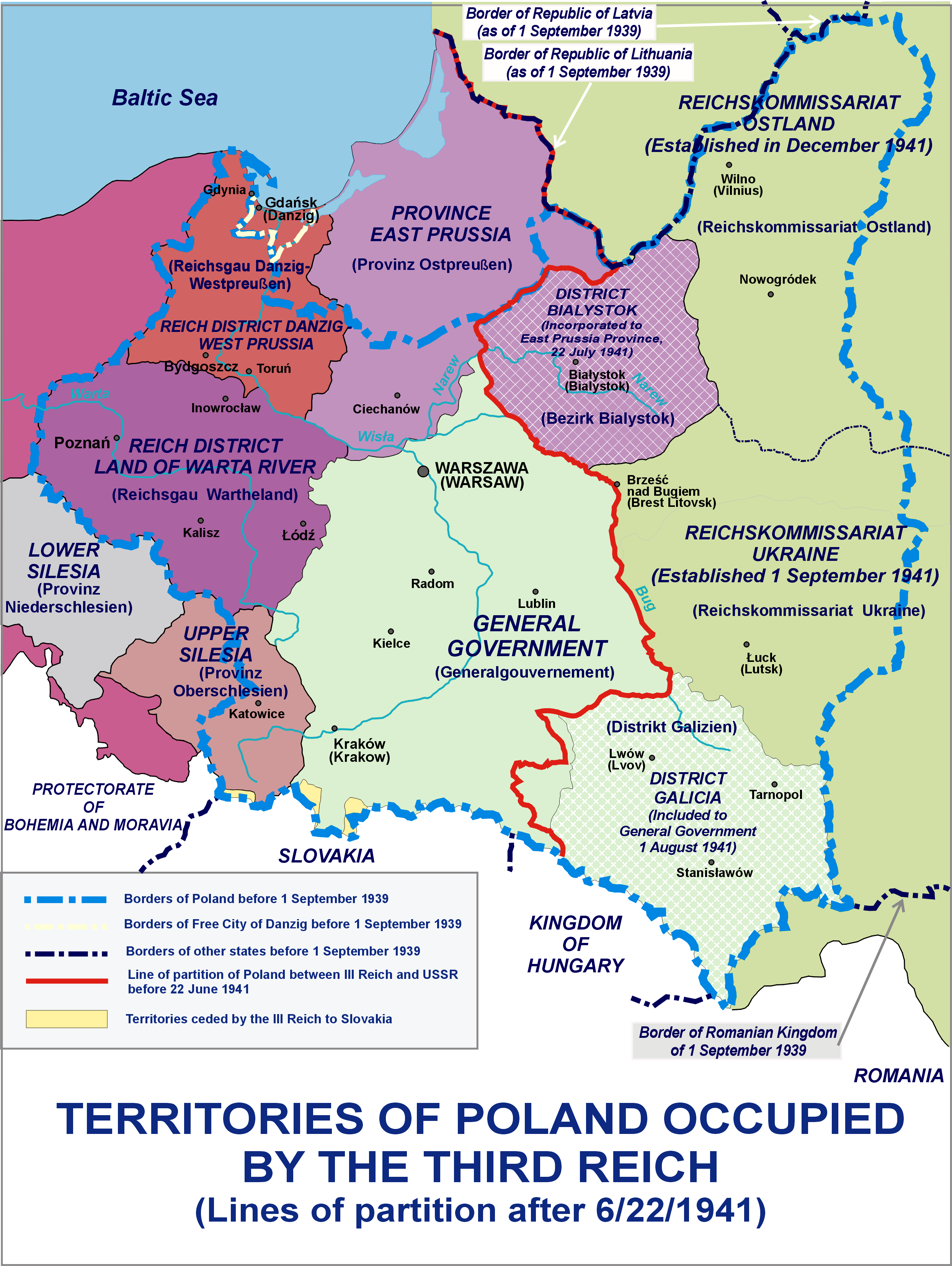
Borders of Polish areas before and after 1939 and 1941 invasions

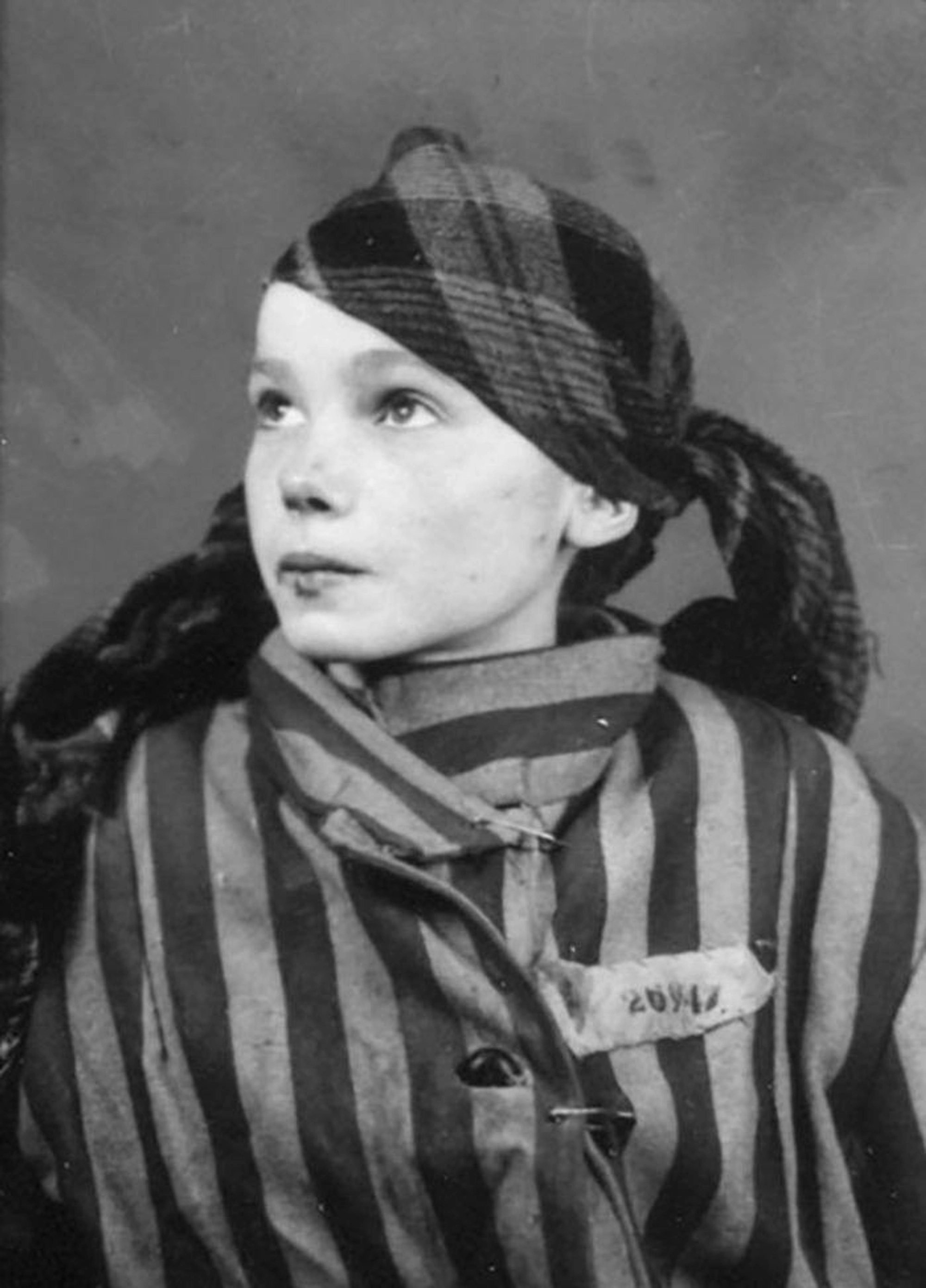
Czesława Kwoka, a Polish Catholic girl, 14 when she was murdered by the Nazi Germans at Auschwitz. 230,000 children, most of them Jewish, were murdered in the German camp.

During World War II, three million Polish Jews (90% of the prewar Polish-Jewish population) were killed due to Nazi German genocidal action. At least 2.5 million non-Jewish Polish civilians and soldiers perished. One million non-Polish Jews were also forcibly transported by the Nazis and killed in German-occupied Poland. At least half of 140,000 ethnic Poles deported died in the Auschwitz camp alone.

After the German invasion, Poland, in contrast to cases such as Vichy France, experienced direct German administration rather than an indigenous puppet government.

The western part of prewar Poland was annexed outright by Germany. Some Poles were expelled from the annexed lands to make room for German settlers. Parts of eastern Poland became part of the Reichskommissariat Ukraine and Reichskommissariat Ostland. The rest of German-occupied Poland, dubbed by Germany the General Government, was administered by Germany as occupied territory. The General Government received no international recognition. It is estimated that the Germans killed more than 2 million non-Jewish Polish civilians. Nazi German planners called for "the complete destruction" of all Poles, and their fate, as well as that of many other Slavs, was outlined in a genocidal Generalplan Ost (General Plan East).

Historians have generally stated that relatively few Poles collaborated with Nazi Germany, in comparison with the situations in other German-occupied countries. The Polish Underground judicially condemned and executed collaborators, and the Polish Government-in-Exile coordinated resistance to the German occupation, including help for Poland's Jews.

Some Poles were complicit in, or indifferent to, the rounding up of Jews. There are reports of neighbors turning Jews over to the Germans or blackmailing them (see "szmalcownik"). In some cases, Poles themselves killed their Jewish fellow citizens, the most notorious examples being the 1941 Jedwabne pogrom and the 1946 Kielce pogrom, the latter taking place after the German occupation had ended.

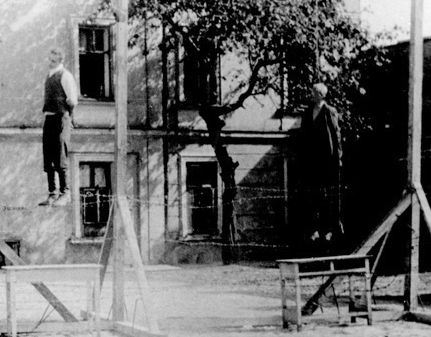
Poles publicly hanged by the Germans for helping Jews in hiding, Przemyśl, 6 September 1943

However, many Poles risked their lives to hide and assist Jews. Poles were sometimes exposed by Jews they were helping, if the Jews were found by the Germans—resulting in the murder of entire Polish rescue networks. Possibly a million Poles aided Jews; some estimates run as high as three million helpers. Poles have the world's highest count of individuals who have been recognized by Israel's Yad Vashem as Righteous among the Nations — non-Jews who risked their lives to save Jews from extermination during the Holocaust.

== Analysis of the expression ==
=== Supporting rationale ===
Defenders argue that the expression "Polish death camps" refers strictly to the location of the Nazi death camps and does not indicate involvement by the Polish government in France or, later, in the United Kingdom. Some international politicians and news agencies have apologized for using the term, notably Barack Obama in 2012. CTV Television Network News President Robert Hurst defended CTV's usage (see § Mass media) as it "merely denoted geographic location", but the Canadian Broadcast Standards Council ruled against it, declaring CTV's use of the term to be unethical. Others have not apologized, saying that it is a fact that Auschwitz, Treblinka, Majdanek, Chełmno, Bełżec, and Sobibór were situated in German-occupied Poland.

Commenting upon the 2018 bill criminalizing such expressions (see § Amendment to the Act on the Institute of National Remembrance), Israeli politician (and later Prime Minister) Yair Lapid justified the expression "Polish death camps" with the argument that "hundreds of thousands of Jews were murdered without ever meeting a German soldier". In response, the Auschwitz-Birkenau Memorial and Museum released a statement calling Lapid's claims a "conscious lie" and accusing him of "using Holocaust as a political game", and likening his allegation to the claims made by Holocaust deniers.

=== Criticism of the expression ===
Opponents of the use of these expressions argue that they are inaccurate, as they may suggest that the camps were a responsibility of the Poles, when in fact they were designed, constructed, and operated by the Germans and were used to exterminate both non-Jewish Poles and Polish Jews, as well as Jews transported to the camps by the Germans from across Europe. Historian Geneviève Zubrzycki and the Anti-Defamation League (ADL) have called the expression a misnomer. It has also been described as "misleading" by The Washington Post editorial board, The New York Times, the Canadian Broadcast Standards Council, and Nazi hunter Dr. Efraim Zuroff. Holocaust memorial Yad Vashem described it as a "historical misrepresentation", and White House spokesman Tommy Vietor referred to its use a "misstatement".

Abraham Foxman of the ADL described the strict geographical defence of the terms as "sloppiness of language", and "dead wrong, highly unfair to Poland". Polish Minister of Foreign Affairs Adam Daniel Rotfeld said in 2005 that "Under the pretext that 'it's only a geographic reference', attempts are made to distort history".

== Public use of the expression ==
As early as 1944, the expression "Polish death camp" appeared as the title of a Collier's magazine article, entitled "Polish Death Camp". This was an excerpt from the Polish resistance fighter Jan Karski's 1944 memoir, Courier from Poland: The Story of a Secret State (reprinted in 2010 as Story of a Secret State: My Report to the World). Karski himself, in both the book and the article, had used the expression "Jewish death camp", not "Polish death camp". As shown in 2019, the Collier's editor changed the title of Karski's article typescript, "In the Belzec Death Camp", to "Polish Death Camp".

Other early-postwar, 1945 uses of the expression "Polish death camp" occurred in the periodicals Contemporary Jewish Record, The Jewish Veteran, and The Palestine Yearbook and Israeli Annual, as well as in a 1947 book, Beyond the Last Path, by Hungarian-born Jew and Belgian resistance fighter Eugene Weinstock and in Polish writer Zofia Nałkowska's 1947 book, Medallions.

A 2016 article by Matt Lebovic stated that West Germany's Agency 114, which during the Cold War recruited former Nazis to West Germany's intelligence service, worked to popularize the term "Polish death camps" in order to minimize German responsibility for, and implicate Poles in, the atrocities.

=== Mass media ===
On 30 April 2004 a Canadian Television (CTV) Network News report referred to "the Polish camp in Treblinka". The Polish embassy in Canada lodged a complaint with CTV. Robert Hurst of CTV, however, argued that the term "Polish" was used throughout North America in a geographical sense, and declined to issue a correction. The Polish Ambassador to Ottawa then complained to the National Specialty Services Panel of the Canadian Broadcast Standards Council. The Council rejected Hurst's argument, ruling that the word "'Polish'—similarly to such adjectives as 'English', 'French' and 'German'—had connotations that clearly extended beyond geographic context. Its use with reference to Nazi extermination camps was misleading and improper."

In November 2008, the German newspaper Die Welt called Majdanek concentration camp a "former Polish concentration camp" in an article; it immediately apologized when this was pointed out. In 2009, Zbigniew Osewski, grandson of a Stutthof concentration camp prisoner, sued Axel Springer AG. The case started in 2012; in 2015, the case was dismissed by Warsaw district court.

In the 16 November 2009 edition of Maclean's magazine, the journalist Kathie Engelhart in an article about John Demjanjuk called him a man who had been mistaken for "a notorious sadist at Poland's Treblinka death camp", spoke about "Poland's Treblinka death camp", and stated that Demjanjuk had "served at three Polish camps" as a guard. Engelhart's article led to a formal complaint from Piotr Ogrodziński, the Polish ambassador in Ottawa, who stated: "It's absolutely false that Poles had anything to do with concentration camps, with the exception that they were the first prisoners".

On 23 December 2009, historian Timothy Garton Ash wrote in The Guardian: "Watching a German television news report on the trial of John Demjanjuk a few weeks ago, I was amazed to hear the announcer describe him as a guard in 'the Polish extermination camp Sobibor'. What times are these, when one of the main German TV channels thinks it can describe Nazi camps as 'Polish'? In my experience, the automatic equation of Poland with Catholicism, nationalism and antisemitism – and thence a slide to guilt by association with the Holocaust – is still widespread. This collective stereotyping does no justice to the historical record."

In 2010 the Polish-American Kosciuszko Foundation launched a petition demanding that four major U.S. news organizations endorse use of the expression "German concentration camps in Nazi-occupied Poland".

Canada's Globe and Mail reported on 23 September 2011 about "Polish concentration camps". Canadian Member of Parliament Ted Opitz and Minister of Citizenship and Immigration Jason Kenney supported Polish protests.

In 2013 Karol Tendera, who had been a prisoner at Auschwitz-Birkenau and is secretary of an association of former prisoners of German concentration camps, sued the German television network ZDF, demanding a formal apology and 50,000 zlotys, to be donated to charitable causes, for ZDF's use of the expression "Polish concentration camps". ZDF was ordered by the court to make a public apology. Some Poles felt the apology to be inadequate and protested with a truck bearing a banner that read "Death camps were Nazi German - ZDF apologize!" They planned to take their protest against the expression "Polish concentration camps" 1,600 kilometers across Europe, from Wrocław in Poland to Cambridge, England, via Belgium and Germany, with a stop in front of ZDF headquarters in Mainz.

The New York Times Manual of Style and Usage recommends against using the expression, as does the AP Stylebook, and that of The Washington Post. However, the 2018 Polish bill has been condemned by the editorial boards of The Washington Post and The New York Times.

=== Politicians ===
In May 2012 U.S. President Barack Obama referred to a "Polish death camp" while posthumously awarding the Presidential Medal of Freedom to Jan Karski. After complaints from Poles, including Polish Foreign Minister Radosław Sikorski and Alex Storozynski, President of the Kosciuszko Foundation, an Obama administration spokesperson said the President had misspoken when "referring to Nazi death camps in German-occupied Poland." On 31 May 2012 President Obama wrote a letter to Polish President Komorowski in which he explained that he used this phrase inadvertently in reference to "a Nazi death camp in German-occupied Poland" and further stated: "I regret the error and agree that this moment is an opportunity to ensure that this and future generations know the truth."

== Polish government action ==
=== Media ===
The Polish government and Polish diaspora organizations have denounced the use of such expressions that include the words "Poland" or "Polish". The Polish Ministry of Foreign Affairs monitors the use of such expressions and seeks corrections and apologies if they are used. In 2005, Poland's Jewish Foreign Minister Adam Daniel Rotfeld remarked upon instances of "bad will, saying that under the pretext that 'it's only a geographic reference', attempts are made to distort history and conceal the truth." He has stated that use of the adjective "Polish" in reference to concentration camps or ghettos, or to the Holocaust, can suggest that Poles perpetrated or participated in German atrocities, and emphasised that Poland was the victim of the Nazis' crimes.

=== Monuments ===
In 2008, the chairman of the Polish Institute of National Remembrance (the IPN) wrote to local administrations, calling for the addition of the word "German" before "Nazi" to all monuments and tablets commemorating Germany's victims, stating that "Nazis" is not always understood to relate specifically to Germans. Several scenes of atrocities conducted by Germany were duly updated with commemorative plaques clearly indicating the nationality of the perpetrators. The IPN also requested better documentation and commemoration of crimes that had been perpetrated by the Soviet Union.

The Polish government also asked UNESCO to officially change the name "Auschwitz Concentration Camp" to "Former Nazi German Concentration Camp Auschwitz-Birkenau", to clarify that the camp had been built and operated by Nazi Germany. At its 28 June 2007 meeting in Christchurch, New Zealand, UNESCO's World Heritage Committee changed the camp's name to "Auschwitz Birkenau German Nazi Concentration and Extermination Camp (1940–1945)." Previously some German media, including Der Spiegel, had called the camp "Polish".

=== Amendment to the Act on the Institute of National Remembrance ===
On 6 February 2018 Poland's President Andrzej Duda signed into law an amendment to the Act on the Institute of National Remembrance, criminalizing statements that ascribe collective responsibility in Holocaust-related crimes to the Polish nation, It was generally understood that the law would criminalize use of the expressions "Polish death camp" and "Polish concentration camp". After international backlash, the law was revised to remove criminal penalties, but also the exceptions for scientific or artistic expression. The law met with widespread international criticism, as it was seen as an infringement on freedom of expression and on academic freedom, and as a barrier to open discussion on Polish collaborationism, in what has been described as "the biggest diplomatic crisis in [Poland's] recent history".
