= Gering =

Gering may refer to:

== Places ==
- Gering, Nebraska, a city
- Gering, Germany, a municipality in Mayen-Koblenz, Rhineland-Palatinate

== Other uses ==
- Gering (surname)
- Gering-ding-ding-ding-dingeringeding, one of the lines of gibberish sung in the chorus of "The Fox (What Does the Fox Say?)"
