= Gerhard Schindler =

German jurist (born 1952)

Gerhard Schindler in 2018

Gerhard Schindler (born 4 October 1952 in Kollig, West Germany) is a German civil servant and former President of the Bundesnachrichtendienst (BND), the German Federal Intelligence Service.

== Life ==
Schindler's parents are from Transylvania and Bessarabia. He completed his Abitur in 1972 and spent his military service in a Paratrooper division of the Bundeswehr, the German armed forces. He is an Oberleutnant of the reserves. He began studying legal science in 1974 at Saarland University in Saarbrücken. He passed the first and second German legal exams in 1980 and 1982 respectively.

Schindler served as a Law Enforcement Officer for the Bundesgrenzschutz (Federal Border Guard). In 1985, he became an instructor in the Civil Defense department of the Federal Ministry of the Interior. He served at the Federal Office for the Protection of the Constitution in Cologne from 1987 to 1989 as a division head. In 1989, he returned to the Federal Ministry of the Interior. He served as director of the budget department, permanent representative of the leader of the headquarters and leader of the "Modern State - Modern Administration" administrative department. In 2003, he became the leader of the Counter-terrorism department. Since 2008, he has been Undersecretary for Public security. Within this role, he has provided supervisory oversight for the Federal Criminal Police Office and the Federal Office for the Protection of the Constitution. He is seen as an authority on crime, terrorism, IT security, and computer crime. In 2012, he succeeded Ernst Uhrlau as president of the Bundesnachrichtendienst.

Since November 2016 Schindler is consulting businesses in security issues at the consulting company friedrich30.

In 2021 Schindler founded the consulting company "Monarch". His businesspartners are Stefan Kirsten (manager), Tom Enders (manager), Sandro Gaycken (defence businessmen) and Benjamin Rohé (defence manager). The company promotes a holistic approach to security issues and societal development.

Schindler has been a member of the Free Democratic Party since university. From 1989 to 1994, he was a member of the local council in Nörvenich.

He is married and has one child.

== Controversy ==
Schindler made headlines in May 2012 when he used his personal agency airplane (a Dassault Falcon 900) to transport a rug weighing 30 kilograms (66 lb) from Afghanistan back to Germany for free as a "personal favor" for Dirk Niebel, the Federal Minister of Economic Cooperation and Development. Niebel did not make a customs declaration or payment of duty until after the issue was investigated by Der Spiegel, a German weekly news magazine. Schindler and Niebel's public statements contradicted each other.

In July 2013, Schindler was pressed for answers in the wake of the Global surveillance disclosures when it was reported that the German Army was using PRISM to support its operations in Afghanistan as early as 2011. The BND stated that a separate NATO platform was in use, which was contested by the Federal Ministry of Defence.

Beginning on 10 August 2013, German media reported that under Schindler's direction, the BND was passing mobile phone data to the United States that was used in the U.S.'s targeted killing program.

In April 2015, Schindler was criticized by politicians of all parties in the German Parliament for the BND's cooperation with the NSA for spying on European firms and politicians, including German interests. The Left and the Green Party called for Schindler to be fired; the Social Democratic Party, the junior coalition partner, called for an investigation.
