= Kerben =

Kerben may refer to:

- Kerben, Kyrgyzstan, a city in Jalal-Abad oblast, Kyrgyzstan
- Kerben, Germany, a village in Rhineland-Palatinate, Germany
