= Welling, Germany =

Welling
- Municipality
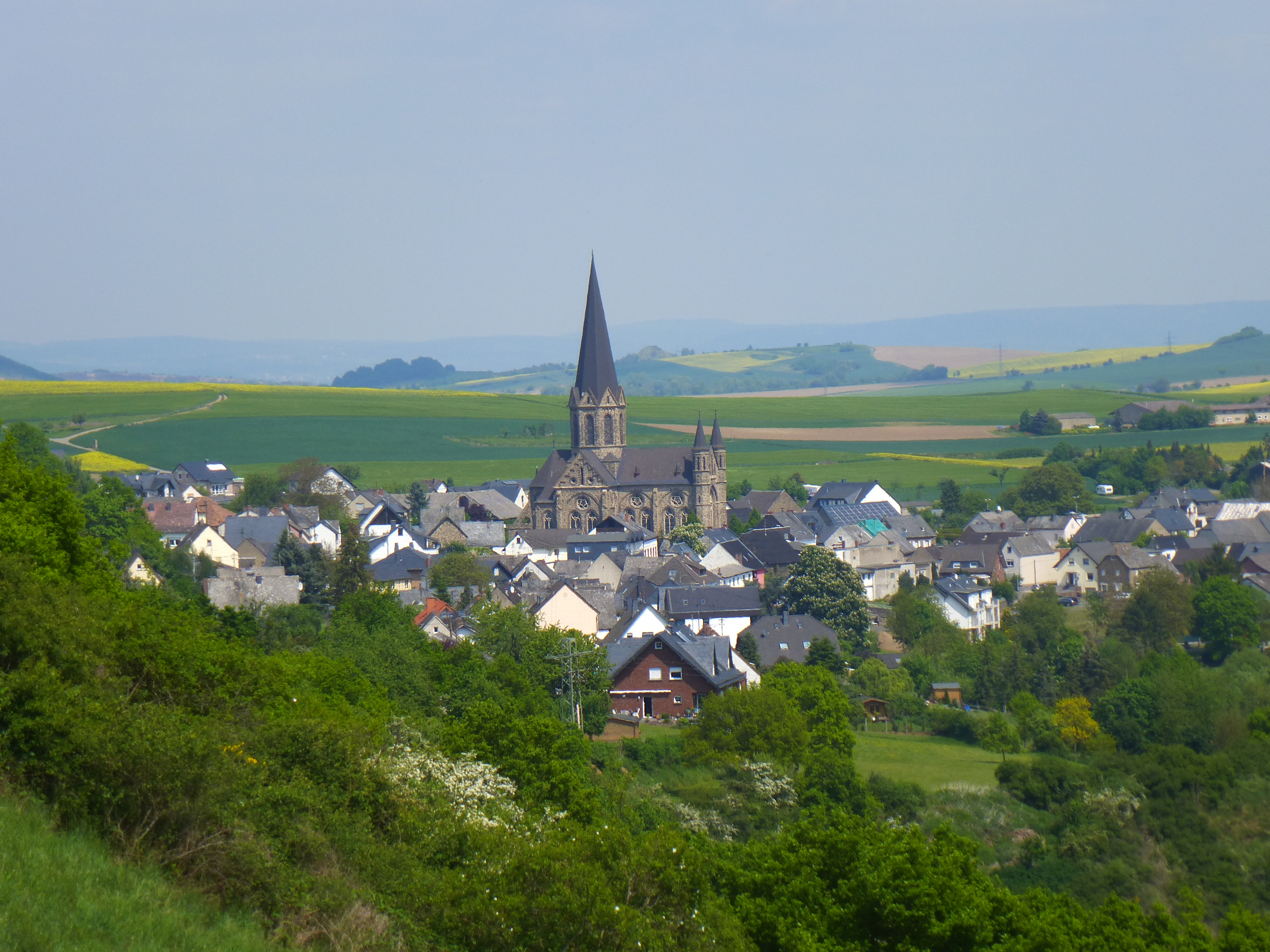

- Coat of arms

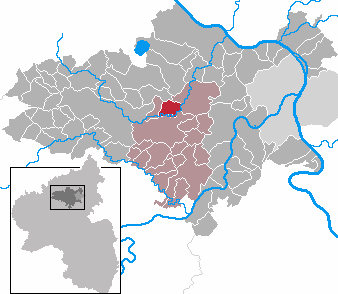
- Location of Welling within Mayen-Koblenz district
- Interactive map of Welling
- Location within Germany Location within Rhineland-Palatinate
- Coordinates: 50°19′51″N 7°18′53″E
- Country: Germany
- State: Rhineland-Palatinate
- District: Mayen-Koblenz
- Municipal assoc.: Maifeld

Government
  - Mayor (2019–24): Manfred Gerner

Area
  - Total: 6.82 km^{2} (2.63 sq mi)
- Elevation: 195 m (640 ft)

Population (2025-12-31)
  - Total: 941
  - Density: 138/km^{2} (357/sq mi)
- Time zone: UTC+01:00 (CET)
  - Summer (DST): UTC+02:00 (CEST)
- Postal codes: 56753
- Dialling codes: 02654
- Vehicle registration: MYK

Welling (German pronunciation: [ˈvɛlɪŋ]) is a municipality in the district of Mayen-Koblenz in Rhineland-Palatinate, western Germany.
