= Kalt, Rhineland-Palatinate =

- Municipality
- Coat of arms

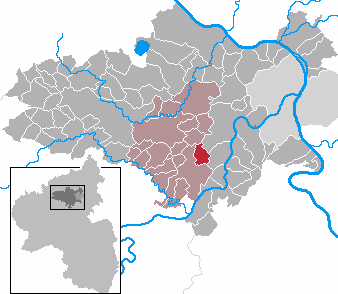
- Location of Kalt, Rhineland-Palatinate within Mayen-Koblenz district
- Interactive map of Kalt, Rhineland-Palatinate
- Location within Germany Location within Rhineland-Palatinate
- Coordinates: 50°16′01″N 7°23′50″E
- Country: Germany
- State: Rhineland-Palatinate
- District: Mayen-Koblenz
- Municipal assoc.: Maifeld

Government
  - Mayor (2019–24): Martin Moser

Area
  - Total: 5.36 km^{2} (2.07 sq mi)
- Elevation: 200 m (660 ft)

Population (2025-12-31)
  - Total: 446
  - Density: 83.2/km^{2} (216/sq mi)
- Time zone: UTC+01:00 (CET)
  - Summer (DST): UTC+02:00 (CEST)
- Postal codes: 56294
- Dialling codes: 02605
- Vehicle registration: MYK
- Website: www.gemeinde-kalt.de

Kalt (German pronunciation: [kalt]) is a municipality in the district of Mayen-Koblenz in Rhineland-Palatinate, south Germany.
