= Paul Münstermann =

German agent

Paul Münstermann (18 June 1932 – 30 August 2010) was a German agent, the former Vice President of the Federal Intelligence Service (Bundesnachrichtendienst).
