= Mertloch =

- Municipality
- Coat of arms

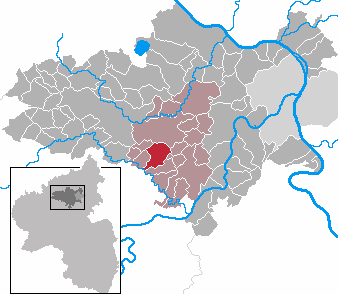
- Location of Mertloch within Mayen-Koblenz district
- Interactive map of Mertloch
- Location within Germany Location within Rhineland-Palatinate
- Coordinates: 50°16′12″N 7°18′21″E
- Country: Germany
- State: Rhineland-Palatinate
- District: Mayen-Koblenz
- Municipal assoc.: Maifeld

Government
  - Mayor (2019–24): Matthias Dahmen

Area
  - Total: 10.28 km^{2} (3.97 sq mi)
- Elevation: 200 m (660 ft)

Population (2025-12-31)
  - Total: 1,318
  - Density: 128.2/km^{2} (332.1/sq mi)
- Time zone: UTC+01:00 (CET)
  - Summer (DST): UTC+02:00 (CEST)
- Postal codes: 56753
- Dialling codes: 02654
- Vehicle registration: MYK

Mertloch (German pronunciation: [ˈmɛʁtˌlɔx]) is a municipality in the district of Mayen-Koblenz in Rhineland-Palatinate, western Germany.
