= Heinrich Klee =

German theologian

Heinrich Klee (20 April 1800 in Münstermaifeld, Rhine province – 28 July 1840 in Munich) was a German theologian and Biblical exegete who argued against liberal and Rationalist currents in Catholic thought.

== Biography ==
At the age of seventeen Klee entered the seminary at Mainz. In 1824, a year after his ordination, he was appointed to the professorship of exegesis and ecclesiastical history in the same seminary, and in the following year also to that of philosophy. In the meantime he obtained the Doctorate of Theology from the University of Würzburg after presenting the thesis Tentamen theologico-historicum de chiliasmo primorum saecolurum. In 1829, the government of Baden tendered him the chair of exegesis at the University of Freiburg, vacated by Johann Leonhard Hug, and at the same time the Prussian authorities offered him a professorship either at the University of Breslau or the University of Bonn.

Klee chose Bonn; but his position there was a difficult one. George Hermes and his ideas were strong there, and the presence of Klee, an exponent of orthodox Catholicism, was viewed with disfavour by his Rationalist colleagues. After ten years' stay at the University of Bonn, during which he taught dogmatic and moral theology, the history of dogma and exegesis, Klee was induced by the conflict between the Archbishop von Droste-Vichering of Cologne and the Hermesian professors to accept the call to the Ludwig-Maximilians-Universität München as successor to Johann Adam Möhler in the chair of dogmatic theology and exegesis, but an early death carried him off within a year.

== Published works ==
Klee's publisher works include:

- Die Beicht, a work which shows his close acquaintance with the Church Fathers, published in Frankfurt in 1827
- Commentar über das Evangelium nach Johannes (Commentary on the Gospel of John; Mainz 1829)
- Commentar über den Romerbrief (Commentary on the Epistle to the Romans; Mainz 1830)
- Enclcylopädie des Theologie (Mainz 1832)
- Auslegung des Briefes an de Hebrä (Interpretation of the Letter to the Hebrews; Mainz 1883)
- Die Ehe, dogmatisch-arch-ä Abhandlung (Mainz 1833; 2nd Ed., 1835)
- Katholische Dogmatik in three volumes which went through four editions (Mainz 1834-5, 1840, 1844 and 1861)
- Lehrbuch der Dogmengeschichte in two volumes (Textbook on the History of Dogma; Mainz, 1837-8)
- A posthumous work, Grundris der Ethik, edited by Heinrich Himioben (Mainz, 1843; 2nd ed. 1847)
