= Münstermaifeld =

- Town
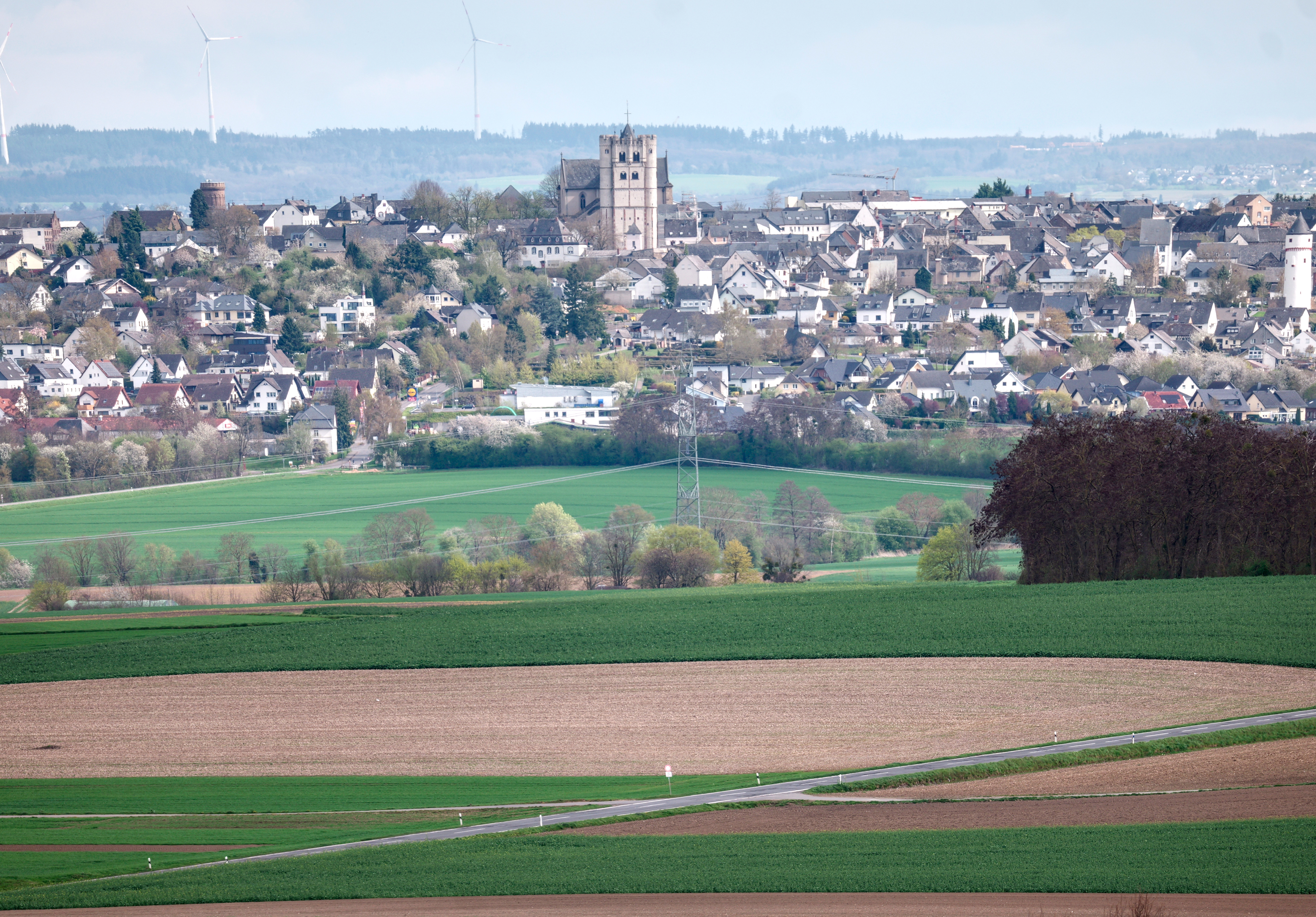

- Coat of arms

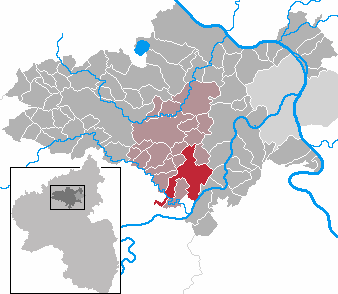
- Location of Münstermaifeld within Mayen-Koblenz district
- Interactive map of Münstermaifeld
- Location within Germany Location within Rhineland-Palatinate
- Coordinates: 50°14′51″N 7°21′47″E
- Country: Germany
- State: Rhineland-Palatinate
- District: Mayen-Koblenz
- Municipal assoc.: Maifeld
- Subdivisions: 6

Government
  - Mayor (2019–24): Claudia Schneider (CDU)

Area
  - Total: 27.77 km^{2} (10.72 sq mi)
- Elevation: 271 m (889 ft)

Population (2025-12-31)
  - Total: 3,387
  - Density: 122.0/km^{2} (315.9/sq mi)
- Time zone: UTC+01:00 (CET)
  - Summer (DST): UTC+02:00 (CEST)
- Postal codes: 56294
- Dialling codes: 02605
- Vehicle registration: MY
- Website: www.muenstermaifeld.de

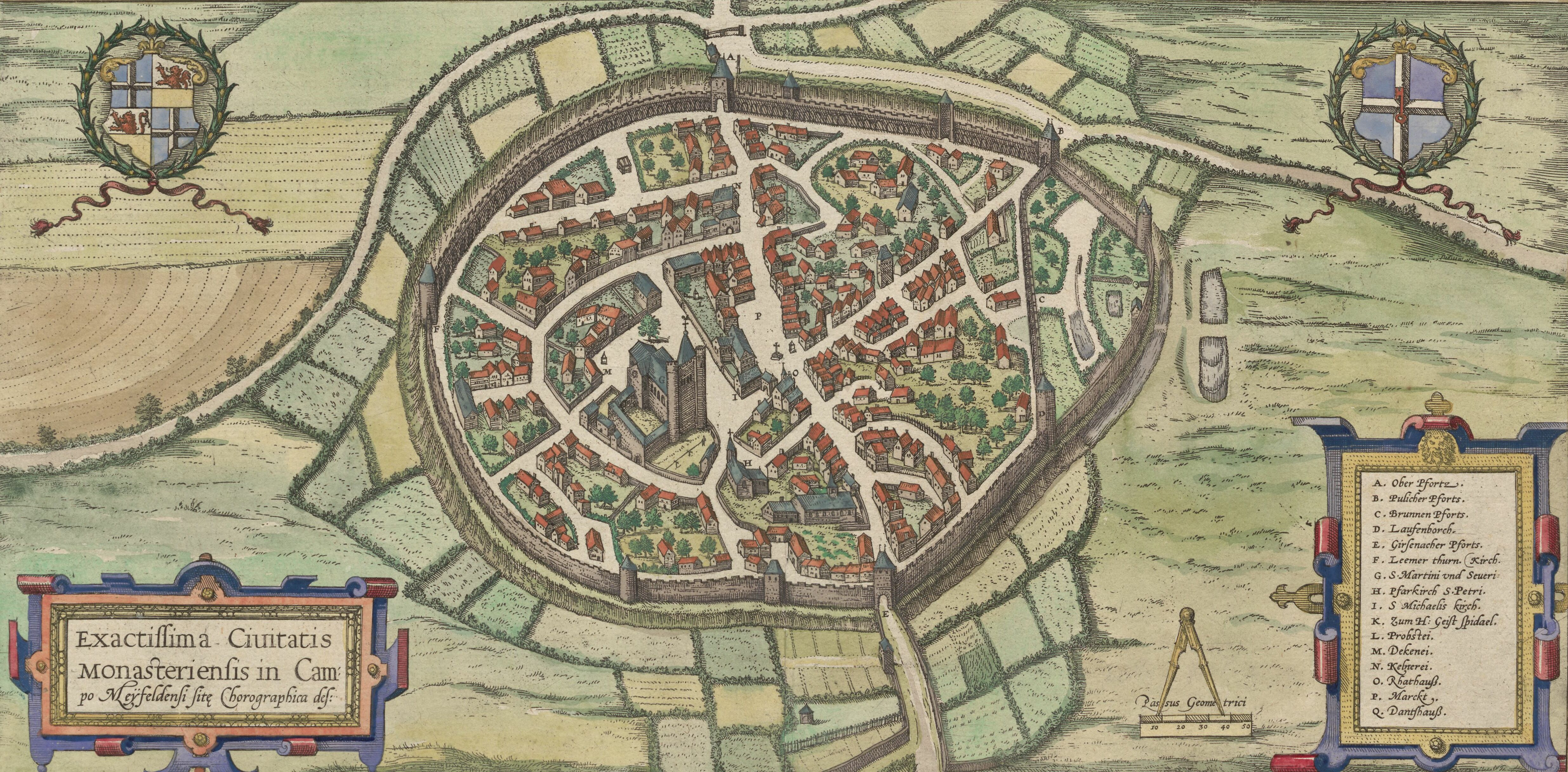
Münstermaifeld 1600

Münstermaifeld (German pronunciation: [ˌmʏnstɐˈmaɪfɛlt]) is a town in the district Mayen-Koblenz, in Rhineland-Palatinate, Germany. It is part of the Verbandsgemeinde ("collective municipality") of Maifeld. It is situated south-east of Mayen, a few kilometres from the Moselle river and Eltz Castle. The first (B.C.) residents of the region were Celts. The old church is based on a Roman castle-tower. After the Romans, the Franks (Charlemagne) arrived in the 9th century. In the Middle Ages (1277) Münstermaifeld received town privileges and was governed by the bishop of Trier. It is one of the oldest towns in Rhineland-Palatinate and, with its 3,400 citizens, one of the smallest.

== Mayors ==
- up to 2009: Maximilian Mumm
- 2009–2014: Robert Müller
- since 2014: Claudia Schneider (CDU)

== Born in Münstermaifeld ==
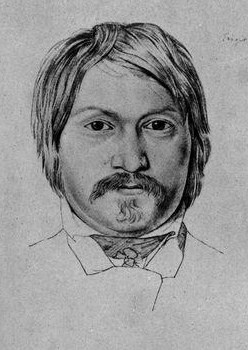
Anton Josef Dräger

- Julia Drusilla (16-38), sister of the Emperor Caligula
- Jakob von Eltz-Rübenach (1510–1581) Archbishop-Elector of Trier from 1567 to 1581
- Franz Josef Ignaz Canaris (1791-1828), great-grandfather of Wilhelm Canaris
- Anton Josef Dräger (1794-1833), painter
- Heinrich Klee (1800-1840), Catholic theologian
- Johann Martin Josef Canaris (1817-1894), grandfather of Wilhelm Canaris
- Joseph Wolf (1820-1899), animal painter
- Thomas Anders (born 1963), pop singer and music producer
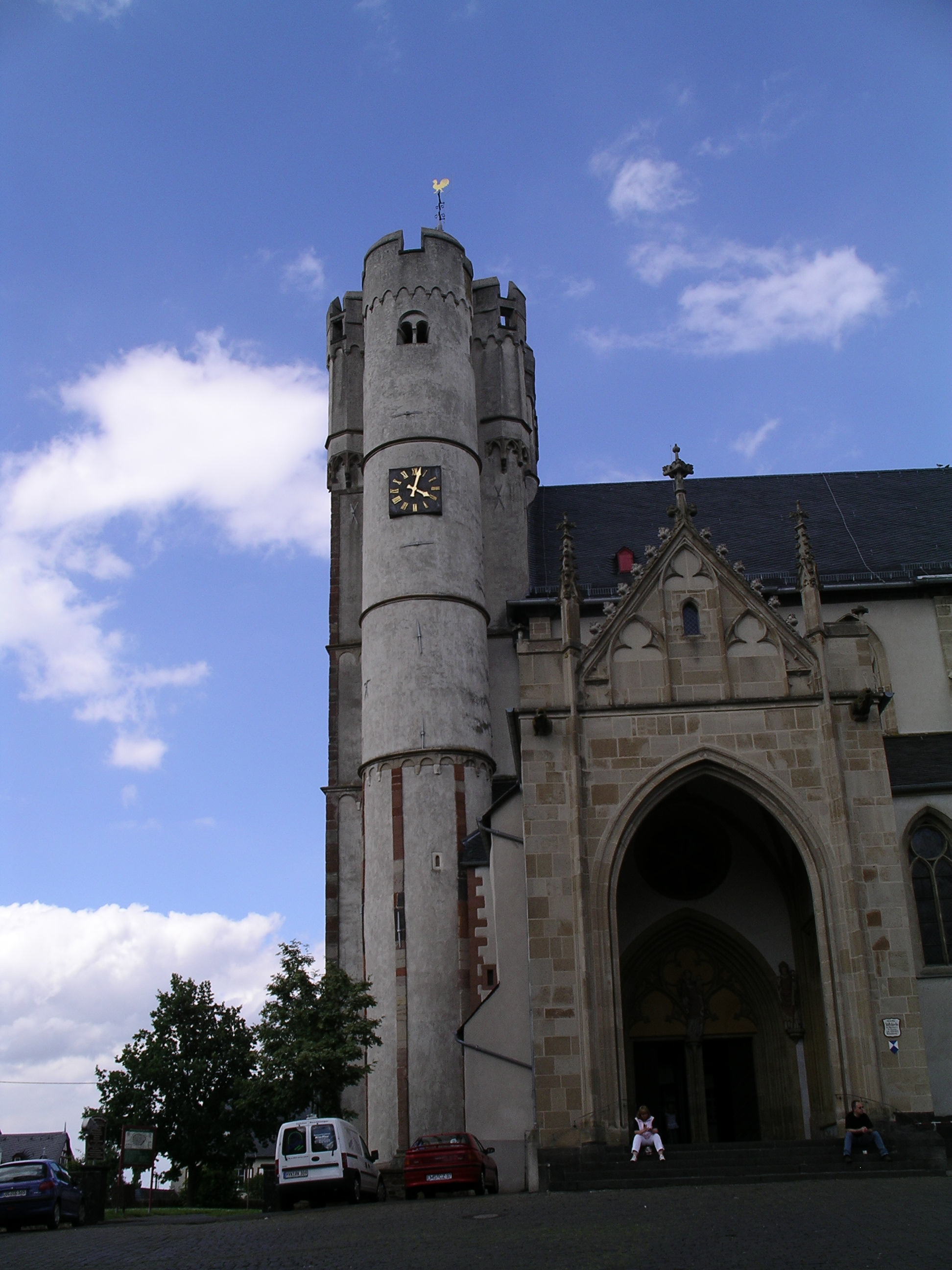
St. Martin and St. Severus church in Münstermaifeld

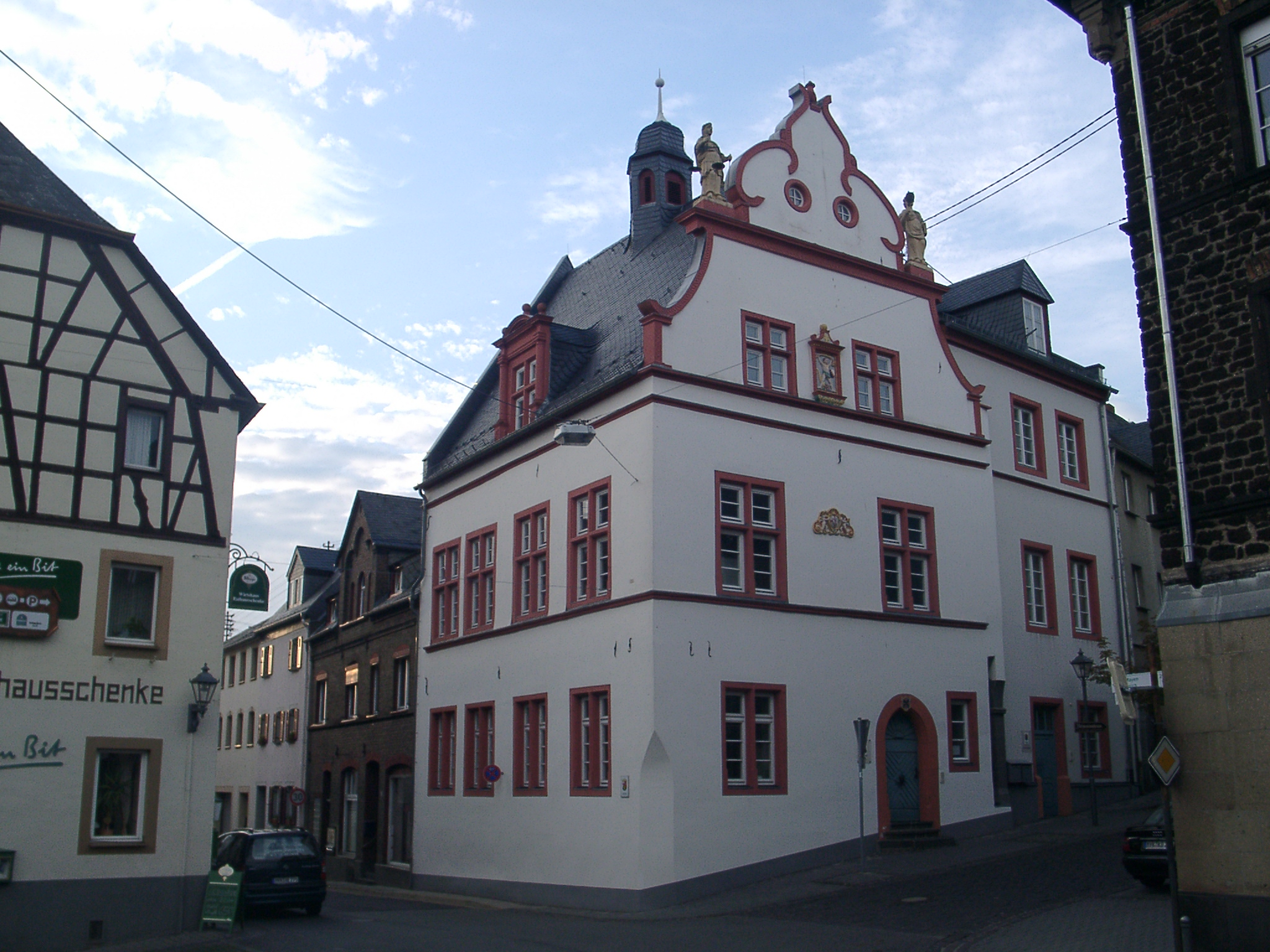
Town hall of Münstermaifeld

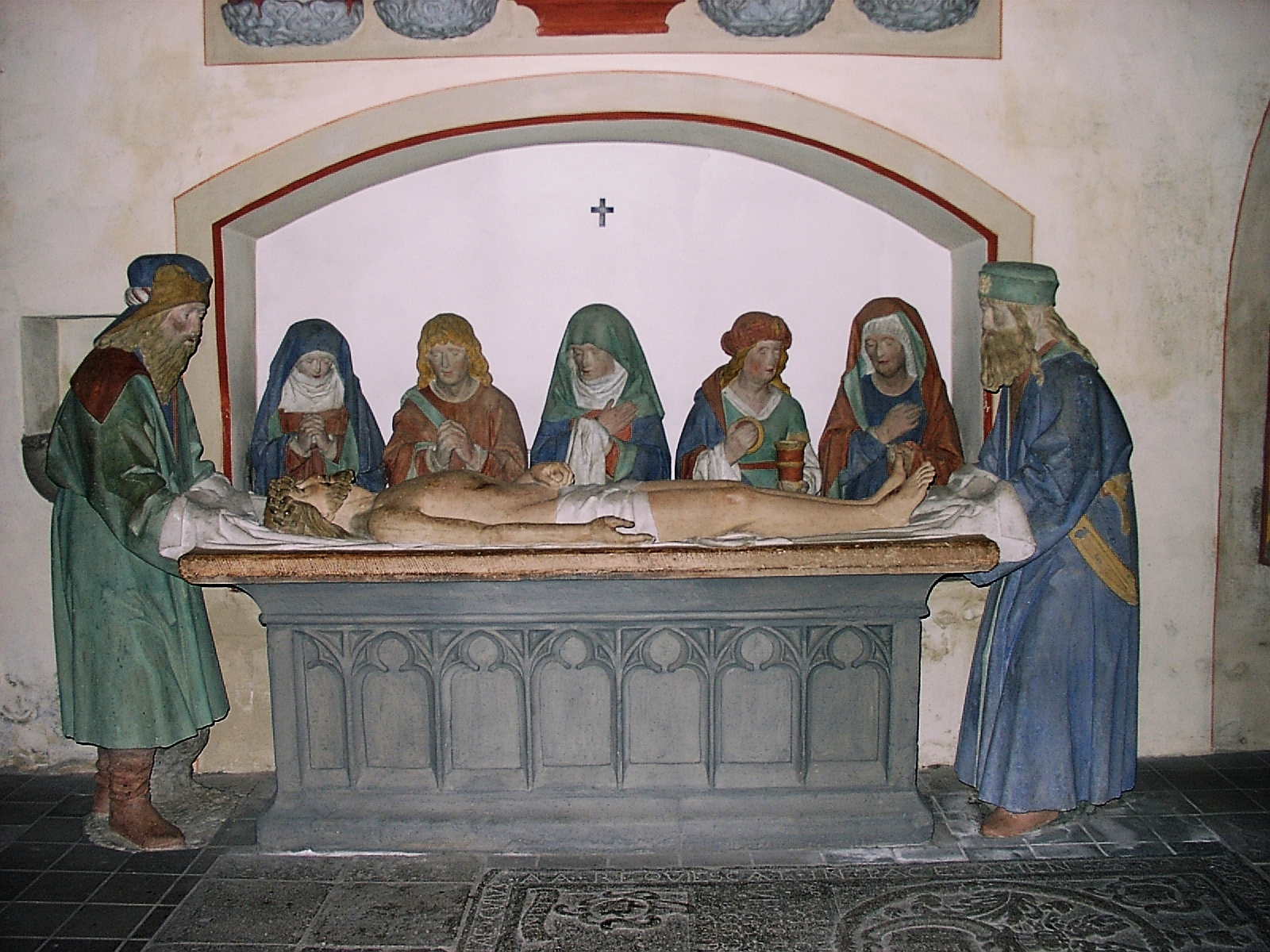
"Holy Sepulchre - Entombment of Christ" sculpture in the Maifeldmünster church
