= Gierschnach =

- Municipality
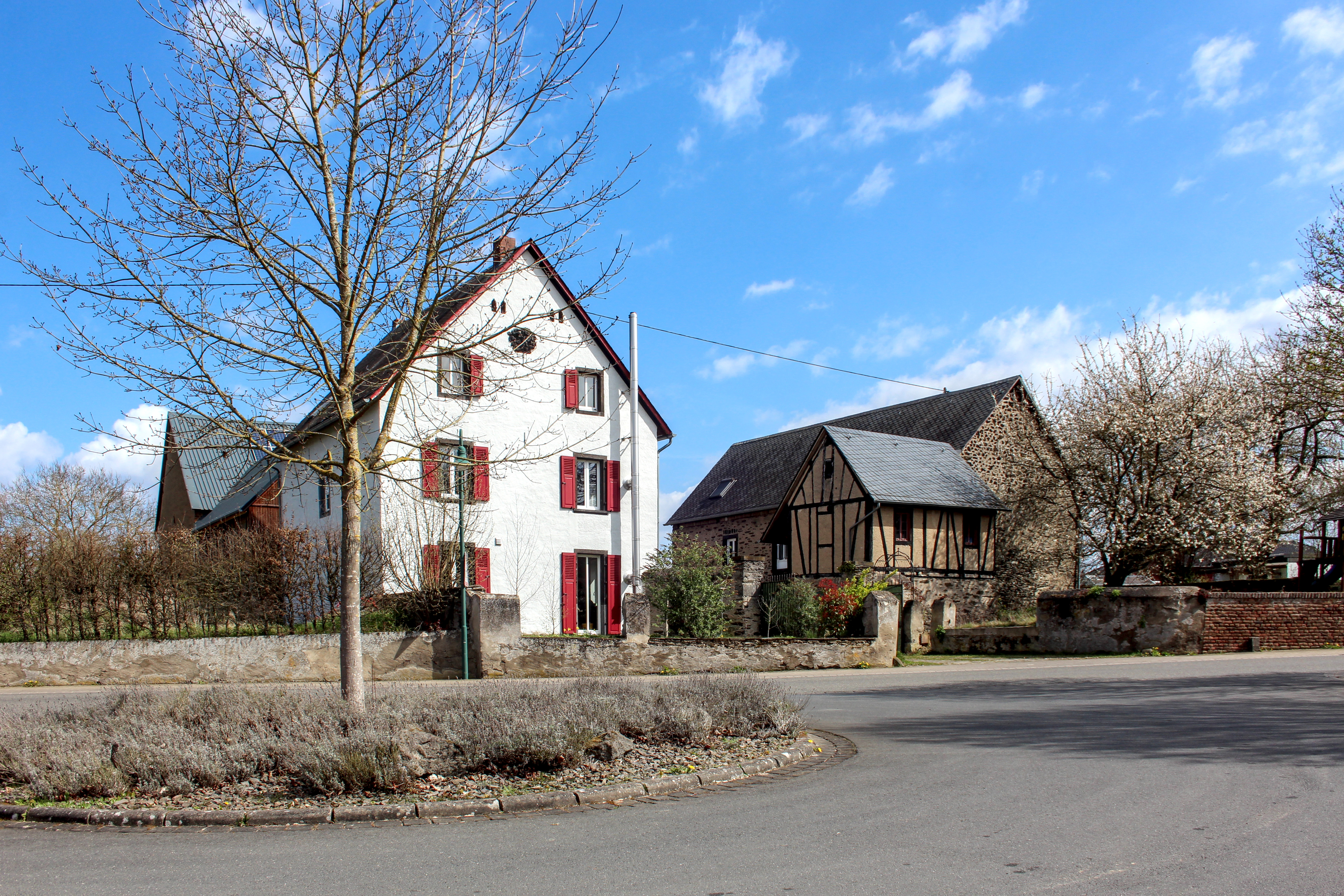

- Coat of arms

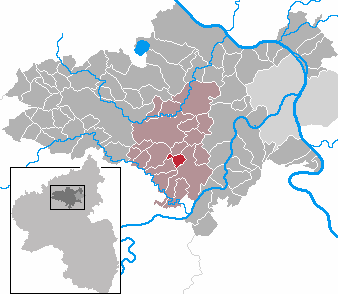
- Location of Gierschnach within Mayen-Koblenz district
- Interactive map of Gierschnach
- Location within Germany Location within Rhineland-Palatinate
- Coordinates: 50°15′47″N 7°21′03″E
- Country: Germany
- State: Rhineland-Palatinate
- District: Mayen-Koblenz
- Municipal assoc.: Maifeld

Government
  - Mayor (2023–24): Matthias Hörsch

Area
  - Total: 3.27 km^{2} (1.26 sq mi)
- Elevation: 170 m (560 ft)

Population (2025-12-31)
  - Total: 270
  - Density: 83/km^{2} (210/sq mi)
- Time zone: UTC+01:00 (CET)
  - Summer (DST): UTC+02:00 (CEST)
- Postal codes: 56294
- Dialling codes: 02605
- Vehicle registration: MYK

Gierschnach (German pronunciation: [ˈɡiːɐ̯ʃnax]) is a municipality in the district of Mayen-Koblenz in Rhineland-Palatinate, western Germany.
