= Kolliger Mühle =

Watermill in Kollig, Germany

Coordinates: 50.260°N 7.252°E

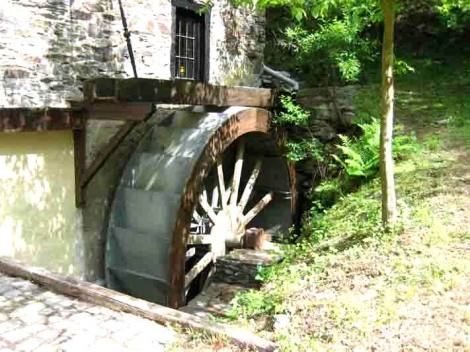
The wheel of the water mill

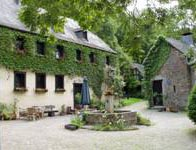
Residence

The Kollig mill (German: Kolliger Mühle) is a watermill in Kollig, in the German Eifel region, 30 kilometres (19 mi) west of Koblenz and 13 kilometres (8.1 mi) from the river Moselle.

The water wheel of the Kolliger Mühle is driven by the water of a small river, the Elzbach, also called the Elz. It is one of a great number of watermills in the Eifel region. Other watermills in the neighbourhood are the Gehringer Mühle and the Ölmühle.

The oldest part of the mill probably dates from the 17th century. In the course of the centuries restorations have taken place but always bearing in mind the historic aspect of the place.

There are four buildings on the site of the Kollig mill: the Wirtschaftsgebäude with the central heating installation and the water supply device, the residence (Wohnhaus) with the water wheel, a former hen house and a former pigsty. The hen house and the pigsty have been renovated and made fit to live in. The pigsty is now the home of the owners and the former hen house is used as guesthouse (Gästehaus).

The walls of the buildings are half-timbered with slate between the timbers. The roofs too are covered with slate. Between the houses is an inner courtyard paved with cobblestones and with a fountain in the middle. There is a small chapel at the entrance of the grounds.

A branch of the famous historic pilgrim route to Santiago de Compostela (the Way of Saint James) runs along the Kollig mill. Here, pilgrims can find a shelter for the night.

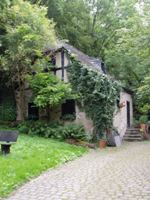
The former hen house, now guesthouse

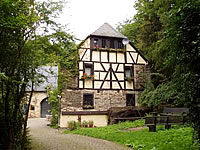
Side of the residence
