= Trimbs =

- Municipality
- Coat of arms

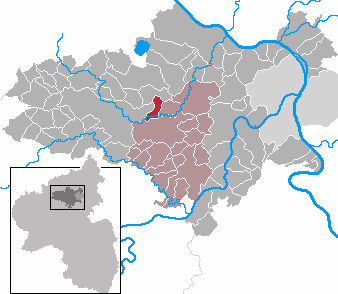
- Location of Trimbs within Mayen-Koblenz district
- Interactive map of Trimbs
- Location within Germany Location within Rhineland-Palatinate
- Coordinates: 50°19′32″N 7°17′57″E
- Country: Germany
- State: Rhineland-Palatinate
- District: Mayen-Koblenz
- Municipal assoc.: Maifeld

Government
  - Mayor (2019–24): Peter Schmitt

Area
  - Total: 4.45 km^{2} (1.72 sq mi)
- Elevation: 663 m (2,175 ft)

Population (2025-12-31)
  - Total: 611
  - Density: 137/km^{2} (356/sq mi)
- Time zone: UTC+01:00 (CET)
  - Summer (DST): UTC+02:00 (CEST)
- Postal codes: 56753
- Dialling codes: 02654
- Vehicle registration: MYK

Trimbs (German pronunciation: [tʁɪmps]) is a municipality in the district of Mayen-Koblenz in Rhineland-Palatinate, western Germany.
