= Rüber =

- Municipality
- Coat of arms

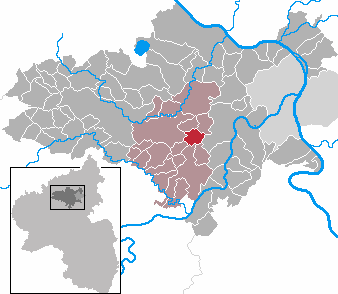
- Location of Rüber within Mayen-Koblenz district
- Interactive map of Rüber
- Location within Germany Location within Rhineland-Palatinate
- Coordinates: 50°17′32″N 7°22′37″E
- Country: Germany
- State: Rhineland-Palatinate
- District: Mayen-Koblenz
- Municipal assoc.: Maifeld

Government
  - Mayor (2019–24): Karin Butter

Area
  - Total: 5.61 km^{2} (2.17 sq mi)
- Elevation: 160 m (520 ft)

Population (2025-12-31)
  - Total: 864
  - Density: 154/km^{2} (399/sq mi)
- Time zone: UTC+01:00 (CET)
  - Summer (DST): UTC+02:00 (CEST)
- Postal codes: 56295
- Dialling codes: 02654
- Vehicle registration: MYK

Rüber (German pronunciation: [ˈʁyːbɐ]) is a municipality in the district of Mayen-Koblenz in Rhineland-Palatinate, western Germany.
