= Gappenach =

- Municipality
- Coat of arms

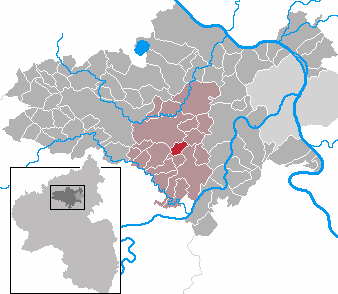
- Location of Gappenach within Mayen-Koblenz district
- Interactive map of Gappenach
- Location within Germany Location within Rhineland-Palatinate
- Coordinates: 50°16′26″N 7°20′44″E
- Country: Germany
- State: Rhineland-Palatinate
- District: Mayen-Koblenz
- Municipal assoc.: Maifeld

Government
  - Mayor (2019–24): Udo Heinemann

Area
  - Total: 3.51 km^{2} (1.36 sq mi)
- Elevation: 170 m (560 ft)

Population (2025-12-31)
  - Total: 363
  - Density: 103/km^{2} (268/sq mi)
- Time zone: UTC+01:00 (CET)
  - Summer (DST): UTC+02:00 (CEST)
- Postal codes: 56294
- Dialling codes: 02654
- Vehicle registration: MYK

Gappenach (German pronunciation: [ˈɡapənax]) is a municipality in the district of Mayen-Koblenz in Rhineland-Palatinate, western Germany.
