= Pillig =

- Municipality
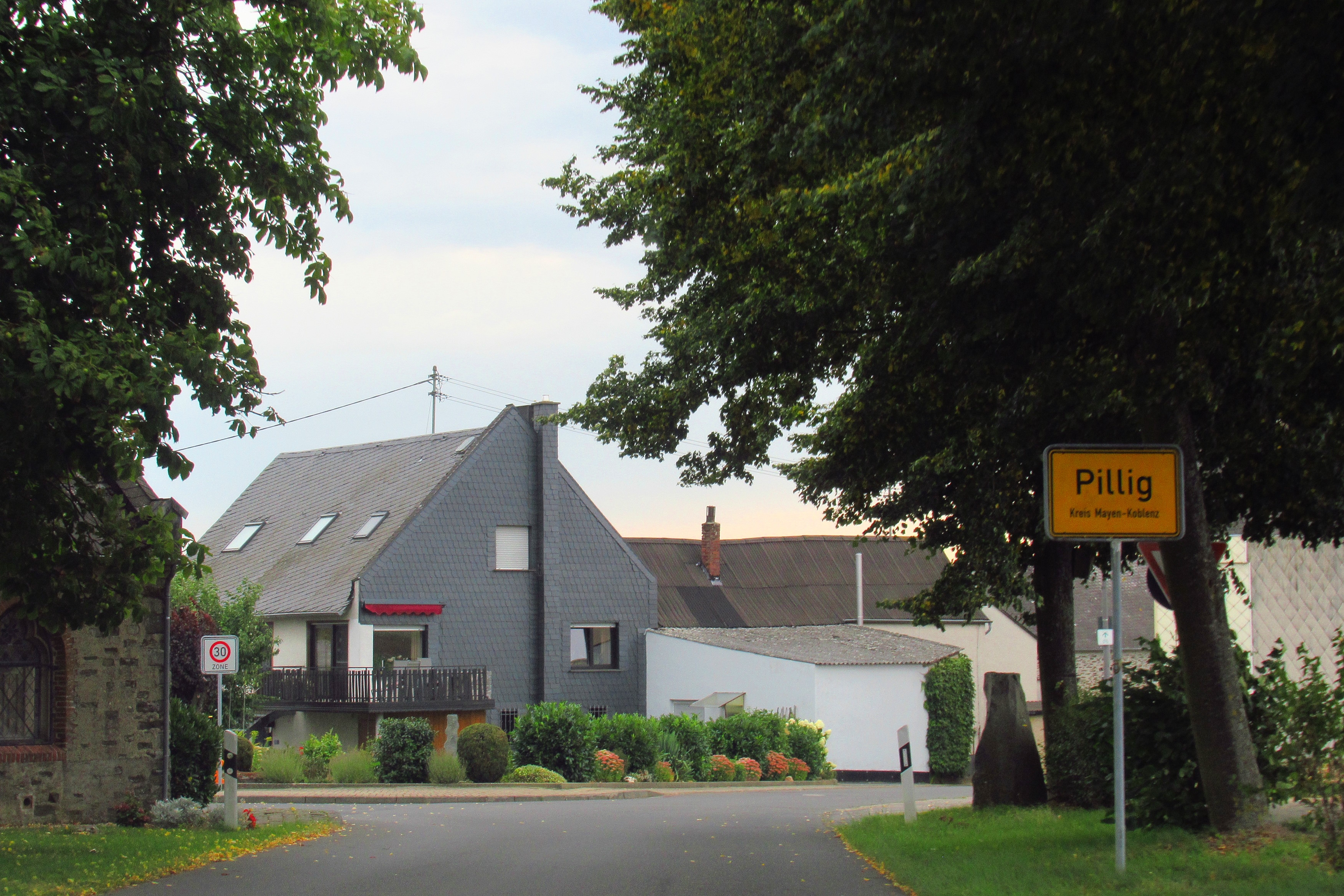

- Coat of arms

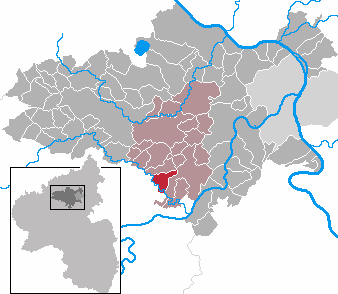
- Location of Pillig within Mayen-Koblenz district
- Interactive map of Pillig
- Location within Germany Location within Rhineland-Palatinate
- Coordinates: 50°14′24″N 7°18′44″E
- Country: Germany
- State: Rhineland-Palatinate
- District: Mayen-Koblenz
- Municipal assoc.: Maifeld

Government
  - Mayor (2019–24): Horst Klee

Area
  - Total: 6.29 km^{2} (2.43 sq mi)
- Elevation: 220 m (720 ft)

Population (2025-12-31)
  - Total: 514
  - Density: 81.7/km^{2} (212/sq mi)
- Time zone: UTC+01:00 (CET)
  - Summer (DST): UTC+02:00 (CEST)
- Postal codes: 56753
- Dialling codes: 02605
- Vehicle registration: MYK
- Website: www.gemeinde-pillig.de

Pillig (German pronunciation: [ˈpɪlɪç]) is a municipality in the district of Mayen-Koblenz in Rhineland-Palatinate, western Germany.
