= Maifeld (Verbandsgemeinde) =

Administrative unit in Germany

- Verbandsgemeinde
- Location of Maifeld within Mayen-Koblenz district
- Interactive map of Maifeld
- Location within Germany Location within Rhineland-Palatinate
- Coordinates: 50°18′N 7°19′E
- Country: Germany
- State: Rhineland-Palatinate
- District: Mayen-Koblenz
- Seat: Polch
- Subdivisions: 18 municipalities

Area
  - Total: 161.76 km^{2} (62.46 sq mi)

Population (2025-12-31)
  - Total: 24,446
  - Density: 151.13/km^{2} (391.41/sq mi)
- Time zone: UTC+01:00 (CET)
  - Summer (DST): UTC+02:00 (CEST)
- Website: www.maifeld.de

Maifeld is a Verbandsgemeinde ("collective municipality") in the district Mayen-Koblenz, in Rhineland-Palatinate, Germany. It is situated south-east of Mayen, and west of Koblenz. The seat of the municipality is in Polch.

== Municipalities ==
The Verbandsgemeinde Maifeld consists of the following Ortsgemeinden ("local municipalities"):

1. Einig
2. Gappenach
3. Gering
4. Gierschnach
5. Kalt
6. Kerben
7. Kollig
8. Lonnig
9. Mertloch
10. Münstermaifeld
11. Naunheim
12. Ochtendung
13. Pillig
14. Polch
15. Rüber
16. Trimbs
17. Welling
18. Wierschem
