= Einig =

- Municipality
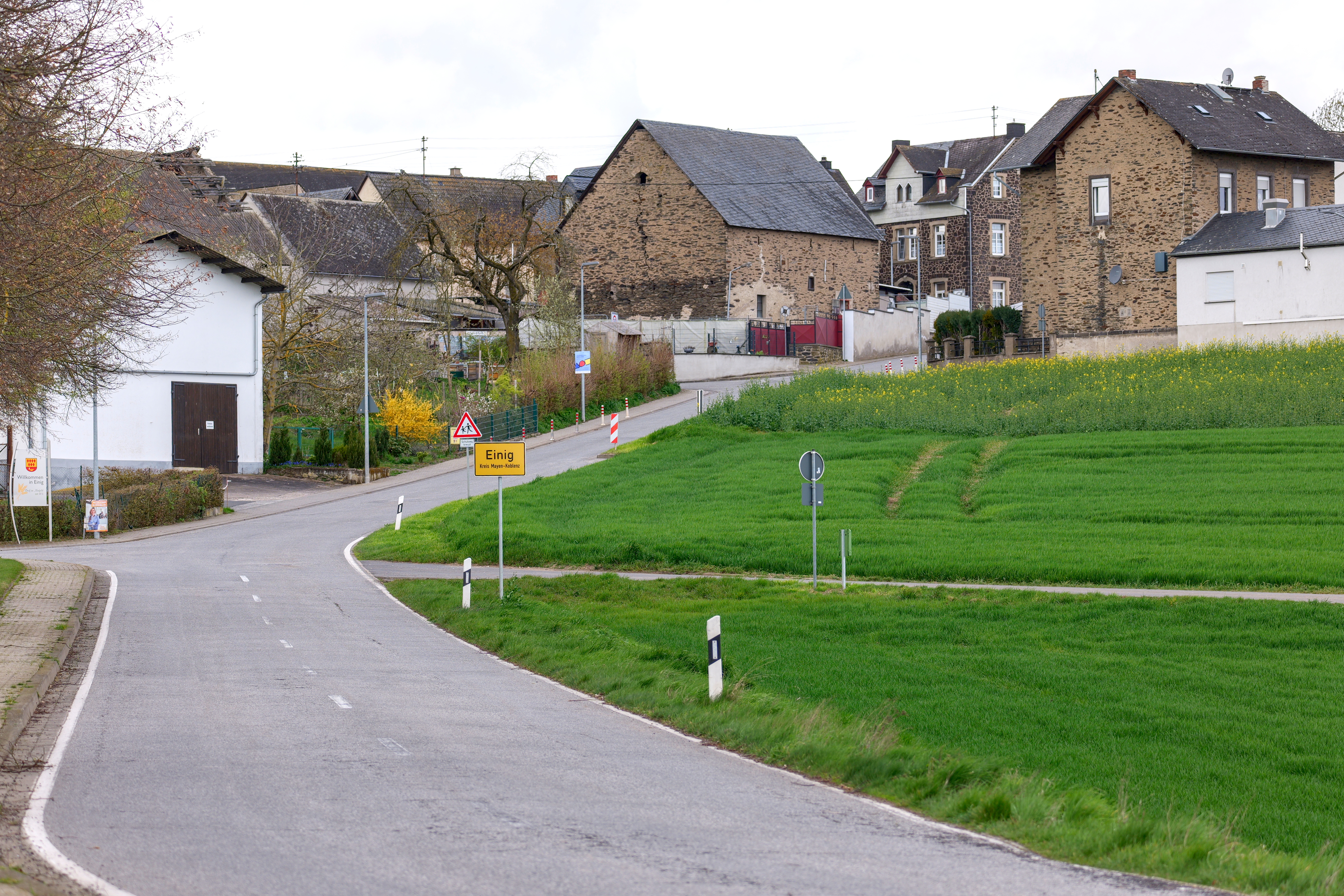

- Coat of arms

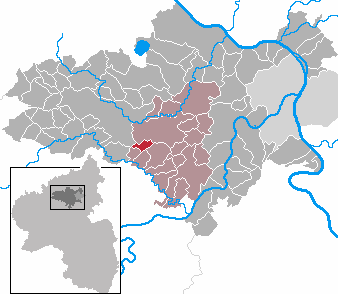
- Location of Einig within Mayen-Koblenz district
- Interactive map of Einig
- Location within Germany Location within Rhineland-Palatinate
- Coordinates: 50°17′01″N 7°16′42″E
- Country: Germany
- State: Rhineland-Palatinate
- District: Mayen-Koblenz
- Municipal assoc.: Maifeld

Government
  - Mayor (2019–24): Hans Münch

Area
  - Total: 3.09 km^{2} (1.19 sq mi)
- Elevation: 310 m (1,020 ft)

Population (2025-12-31)
  - Total: 140
  - Density: 45/km^{2} (120/sq mi)
- Time zone: UTC+01:00 (CET)
  - Summer (DST): UTC+02:00 (CEST)
- Postal codes: 56751
- Dialling codes: 02654
- Vehicle registration: MYK

Einig (German pronunciation: [ˈaɪnɪç]) is a municipality in the district of Mayen-Koblenz in Rhineland-Palatinate, western Germany.
