= Hans-Heinrich Worgitzky =

German soldier and intelligence officer

Hans-Heinrich Worgitzky (1907–1969) was a German officer in World War II and postwar a vice-president of the Bundesnachrichtendienst, the German federal intelligence service.

During World War II, Worgitzky served for a time as the intelligence officer of Army Group Center. Later, as a colonel in 1945, Worgitzky commanded an ad-hoc brigade (later designated as a division) that was named for him (Brigade Worgitzky) and which saw action north of Kassel. Worgitzky was taken prisoner by the U.S. 8th Armored Division on 21 April 1945.

After the war, Worgitzky was made vice-president of the Bundesnachrichtendienst (BND) from 1957 until 1967 and worked for Reinhard Gehlen. During his tenure at the BND, Worgitzky was promoted to major-general in the Bundeswehr reserves.

In 1965, Worgitzky flew to Egypt three times and eventually successfully obtained the release of German spy Gerhard Bauch, who had been arrested on suspicion of working with the Israelis. Worgitzky was held responsible by Gehlen for the Bauch affair and subsequently resigned from the BND. Several months after his resignation, Worgitzky died of a heart attack.

== Sources ==
- Saft, Ulrich. Krieg in der Heimat ... bis zum bitteren Ende im Harz. Walsrode: Militärbuchverlag Saft, 1996. ISBN 3-9801789-2-7.
