= Naunheim =

- Municipality
- Coat of arms

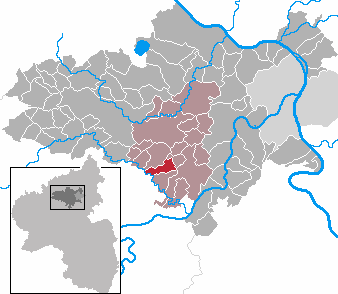
- Location of Naunheim within Mayen-Koblenz district
- Interactive map of Naunheim
- Location within Germany Location within Rhineland-Palatinate
- Coordinates: 50°15′16″N 7°19′21″E
- Country: Germany
- State: Rhineland-Palatinate
- District: Mayen-Koblenz
- Municipal assoc.: Maifeld

Government
  - Mayor (2019–24): Thomas Probstfeld

Area
  - Total: 6.12 km^{2} (2.36 sq mi)
- Elevation: 220 m (720 ft)

Population (2025-12-31)
  - Total: 458
  - Density: 74.8/km^{2} (194/sq mi)
- Time zone: UTC+01:00 (CET)
  - Summer (DST): UTC+02:00 (CEST)
- Postal codes: 56753
- Dialling codes: 02654
- Vehicle registration: MYK

Naunheim (German pronunciation: [ˈnaʊnhaɪm]) is a municipality in the district of Mayen-Koblenz in Rhineland-Palatinate, western Germany.
