= Federal Intelligence Service =

Foreign intelligence agency of Germany

Coordinates: 48°03′50″N 11°32′06″E

- Bundesnachrichtendienst
- Official logo

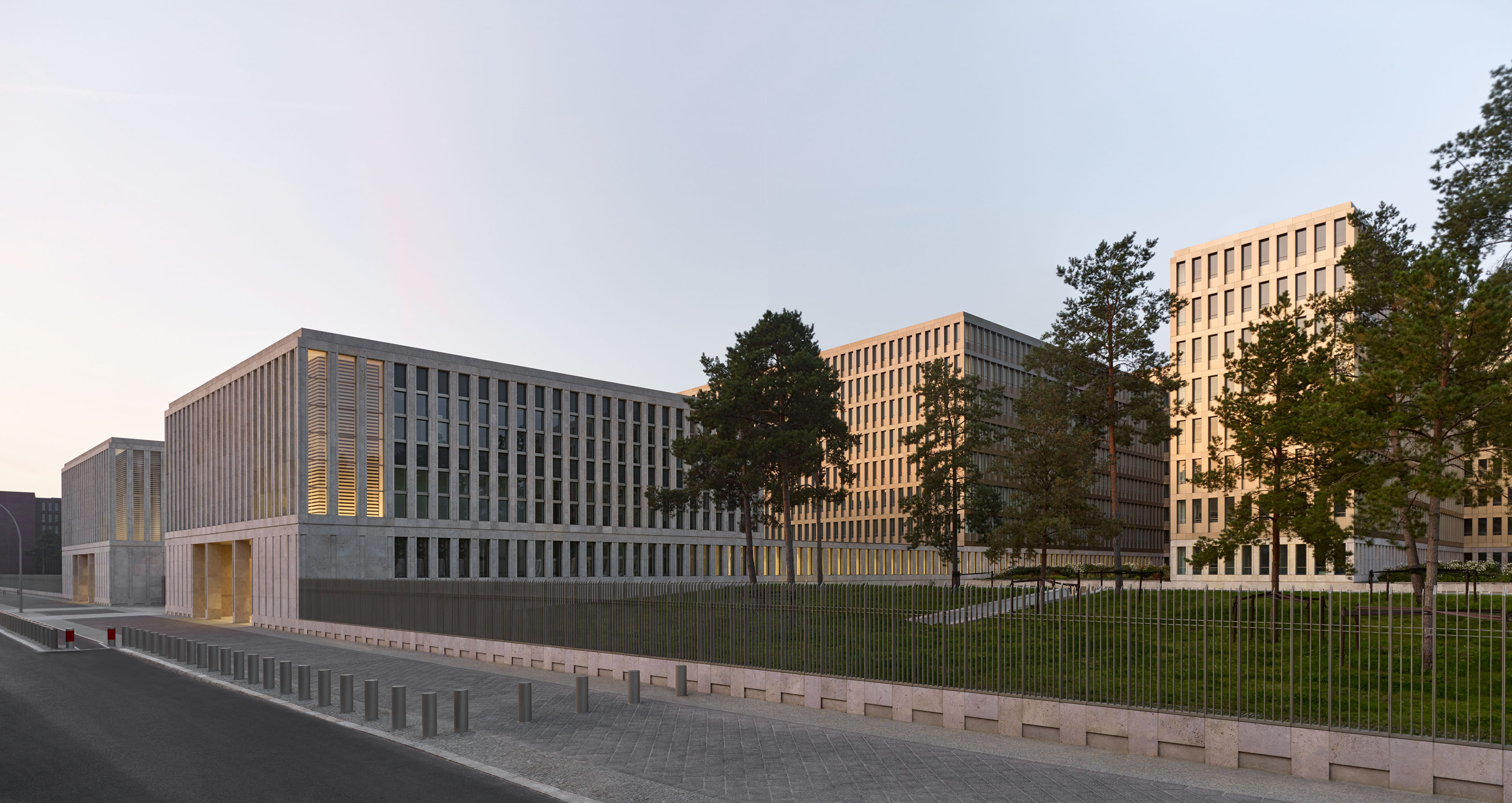
- BND headquarters in Berlin

Agency overview
- Formed: 1 April 1956; 70 years ago
- Preceding agency: Gehlen Organization
- Jurisdiction: Government of Germany
- Headquarters: BND headquarters, Berlin
- Employees: 6,500 (2019)
- Annual budget: €1.08 billion (US$1.3 billion) (FY2021)
- Minister responsible: Nina Warken, Minister for Special Affairs
- Agency executives: Martin Jäger (BND), President; Gabriele Monschau, Vice President for Core Tasks; Ole Diehl, Vice President; GenMaj Dag Baehr, Vice President and Senior Officer
- Parent agency: Federal Chancellery of Germany
- Website: www.bnd.de

The Federal Intelligence Service (German: Bundesnachrichtendienst, pronounced [ˌbʊndəsˈnaːχʁɪçtnˌdiːnst]; BND) is the foreign intelligence agency of Germany, directly subordinate to the Chancellor's Office. The BND headquarters is located in central Berlin. The BND has 300 locations in Germany and foreign countries. In 2016, it employed around 6,500 people; 10% of them are military personnel who are formally employed by the Office for Military Sciences. The BND is the largest agency of the German Intelligence Community.

The BND was founded during the Cold War in 1956 as the official foreign intelligence agency of West Germany, which had recently joined NATO, and in close cooperation with the CIA. It was the successor to the earlier Gehlen Organization, often known simply as "The Organization" or "The Org", a West German intelligence organization affiliated with the CIA whose existence had not been officially acknowledged. The most central figure in the BND's history was General Reinhard Gehlen, the leader of the Gehlen Organization and later the founding president of the BND, who was regarded as "one of the most legendary Cold War spymasters." From the early days of the Cold War, the Gehlen Organization, and later the BND, had an intimate cooperation with the CIA, and often was the western intelligence community's only eyes and ears on the ground in the Eastern Bloc. The BND is also regarded as one of the best informed intelligence services in regards to the Middle East from the 1960s. The BND was quickly established as the western world's second largest intelligence agency, second only to the CIA. Both Russia and the Middle East remain important focuses of the BND's activities, in addition to violent non-state actors.

The BND today acts as an early warning system to alert the German government to threats to German interests from abroad. It depends heavily on wiretapping and electronic surveillance of international communications. It collects and evaluates information on a variety of areas such as international non-state terrorism, weapons of mass destruction proliferation and illegal transfer of technology, organized crime, weapons and drug trafficking, money laundering, illegal migration and information warfare. As Germany's only overseas intelligence service, the BND gathers both military and civil intelligence. While the Strategic Reconnaissance Command (KSA) of the Bundeswehr also fulfills this mission, it is not an intelligence service. There is close cooperation between the BND and the KSA.

The domestic secret service counterparts of the BND are the Federal Office for the Protection of the Constitution (Bundesamt für Verfassungsschutz, or BfV) and 16 counterparts at the state level Landesämter für Verfassungsschutz (State Offices for the Protection of the Constitution); there is also a separate military intelligence organisation, the Military Counterintelligence Service (Militärischer Abschirmdienst, or MAD).

== History ==
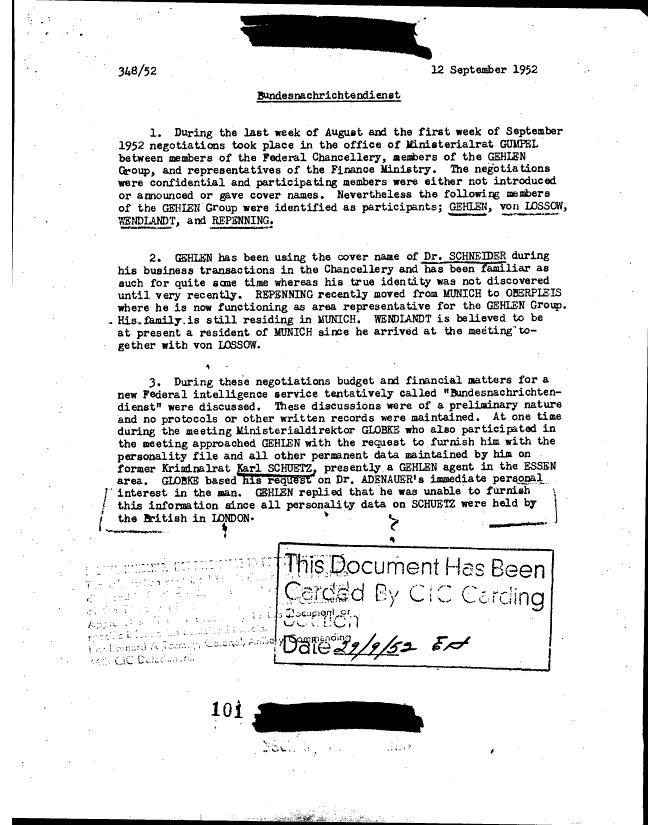
CIA report on negotiations to establish the BND (1952)

The predecessor of the BND was the German eastern military intelligence agency during World War II, the Abteilung Fremde Heere Ost or FHO Section in the General Staff, led by Wehrmacht Major General Reinhard Gehlen. Its main purpose was to collect information on the Red Army. After the war Gehlen worked with the U.S. occupation forces in West Germany.

In 1946 he set up an intelligence agency informally known as the Gehlen Organization or simply "The Org" He recruited some of his former co-workers at Gestapo Trier: Dietmar Lermen, Heinrich Hädderich, August Hill, Friedrich Walz, Albert Schmidt, and Friedrich Heinrich Busch. Many had been operatives of Admiral Wilhelm Canaris' wartime Abwehr (counter-intelligence) organization, but Gehlen also recruited people from the former Sicherheitsdienst (SD), SS and Gestapo, after their release by the Allies. The latter recruits were controversial because the SS and its associated groups were notoriously the perpetrators of many Nazi atrocities during the war. The organization worked at first almost exclusively for the CIA, which contributed funding, equipment, cars, gasoline and other materials.

On 1 April 1956 the Bundesnachrichtendienst was created from the Gehlen Organization, and was transferred to the West German government, with all staff. Reinhard Gehlen became President of the BND and remained its head until 1968.

=== The BND and the Gestapo ===
Several publications have criticized Gehlen and his organizations for hiring ex-Nazis. An article in The Independent on 29 June 2018 made this statement about some of the BND employees:

"Operating until 1956, when it was superseded by the BND, the Gehlen Organisation was allowed to employ at least 100 former Gestapo or SS officers. ... Among them were Adolf Eichmann's deputy Alois Brunner, who would go on to die of old age despite having sent more than 100,000 Jews to ghettos or internment camps, and ex-SS major Emil Augsburg. ... Many ex-Nazi functionaries including Silberbauer, the captor of Anne Frank, transferred over from the Gehlen Organisation to the BND. ... Instead of expelling them, the BND even seems to have been willing to recruit more of them – at least for a few years".

The authors of the book A Nazi Past: Recasting German Identity in Postwar Europe state that Reinhard Gehlen simply did not want to know the backgrounds of the men that the BND hired in the 1950s. The American National Security Archive states that "he employed numerous former Nazis and known war criminals".

James H. Critchfield of the Central Intelligence Agency worked with the Gehlen Organization from 1949 to 1956, and defended Gehlen. In 2001, Critchfield wrote in The Washington Post that "almost everything negative that has been written about Gehlen [as an] ardent ex-Nazi, one of Hitler's war criminals ... is all far from the fact." Critchfield added that Gehlen hired former Sicherheitsdienst (Security Service of the Reichsführer-SS) men "reluctantly, under pressure from German Chancellor Konrad Adenauer to deal with 'the avalanche of subversion hitting them from East Germany.'"

From 2011 to 2018, an independent commission of historians studied the history of the BND in the era of Reinhard Gehlen. The results are published in comprehensive studies. So far (as of April 2020) eleven volumes have been published.

== Operations ==
=== 1960s ===
During the first years of oversight by the State Secretary in the federal chancellery of Konrad Adenauer of the operation in Pullach, Munich District, Bavaria, the BND continued the ways of its forebear, the Gehlen Organization.

The BND racked up its initial east–west cold war successes by concentrating on East Germany. The BND's reach encompassed the highest political and military levels of the GDR regime. They knew the carrying capacity of every bridge, the bed count of every hospital, the length of every airfield, the width and level of maintenance of the roads that Soviet armor and infantry divisions would have to traverse in a potential attack on the West. Almost every sphere of eastern life was known to the BND.

Unsung analysts at Pullach, with their contacts in the East, figuratively functioned as flies on the wall in ministries and military conferences. When the Soviet KGB suspected an East German army intelligence officer, a lieutenant colonel and BND agent, of spying, the Soviets investigated and shadowed him. The BND was positioned and able to inject forged reports implying that the loose spy was actually the KGB investigator, who was then arrested by the Soviets and shipped off to Moscow. Not knowing how long the caper would stay under wraps, the real spy was told to be ready for recall; he made his move to the West at the appropriate time.

The East German regime, however, fought back. With still unhindered flight to the west a possibility, infiltration started on a grand scale and a reversal of sorts took hold. During the early 1960s as many as 90% of the BND's lower-level informants in East Germany worked as double agents for the East German security service, later known as Stasi. Several informants in East Berlin reported in June and July 1961 of street closures, clearing of fields, accumulation of building materials and police and army deployments in specific parts of the eastern sector, as well as other measures that BND determined could lead to a division of the city. However, the agency was reluctant to report communist initiatives and had no knowledge of the scope and timing because of conflicting inputs. The erection of the Berlin Wall on 13 August 1961 thus came as a surprise, and the BND's performance in the political field was thereafter often wrong and remained spotty and unimpressive.

There was a great success for the Federal Intelligence Service during the Cuban Missile Crisis. In 1962, the BND was the first Western intelligence service to have information about the stationing of Soviet medium-range missiles on the Caribbean island and passed it on to the United States. Between 1959 and 1961, Reinhard Gehlen called on Washington several times in vain to "insert the dangerous communist bastion, which at the same time represents an excellent starting point for the communist infiltration of Latin America, into the [USA] sphere of power by rapid access." Gehlen's influence on the US government should not be underestimated, because the BND was able to regularly provide the CIA with detailed information about Soviet arms deliveries through its very good sources in Cuba. There are indications that the secret service was also informed about military actions against Cuba. Ten days before the Bay of Pigs invasion, Gehlen reported to Bonn: "Within a relatively short period of time, large-scale military operations to defeat Fidel Castro will begin." In 1962, the BND also found out from its sources, the Cuban exiles living in Miami, that Cuba was also trying to get hold of weapons through German dealers. According to a BND report, Cuba was also able to recruit four former Waffen-SS officers as instructors for the Cuban armed forces. However, the identity of the men was blacked out in the report.

"This negative view of BND was certainly not justified during ... [1967 and] 1968." The BND's military work "had been outstanding", and in certain sectors of the intelligence field the BND still showed brilliance: in Latin America and in the Middle East it was regarded as the best-informed secret service.

The BND offered a fair and reliable amount of intelligence on Soviet and Soviet-bloc forces in Eastern Europe, regarding the elaboration of a NATO warning system against any Soviet operations against NATO territory, in close cooperation with the Bundeswehr (German Armed Forces).

One high point of BND intelligence work culminated in its early June 1967 forecast – almost to the hour – of the outbreak of the Six-Day War in the Middle East on 5 June 1967.

According to declassified transcripts of a United States National Security Council meeting on 2 June 1967, CIA Director Richard Helms interrupted Secretary of State Dean Rusk with "reliable information" – contrary to Rusk's presentation – that the Israelis would attack on a certain day and time. Rusk shot back: "That is quite out of the question. Our ambassador in Tel Aviv assured me only yesterday that everything was normal." Helms replied: "I am sorry, but I adhere to my opinion. The Israelis will strike and their object will be to end the war in their favor with extreme rapidity." President Lyndon Johnson then asked Helms for the source of his information. Helms said: "Mr. President, I have it from an allied secret service. The report is absolutely reliable." Helms' information came from the BND.

A further laudable success involved the BND's activity during the Czech crisis in 1968; by then, the agency was led by the second president, Gerhard Wessel. With Pullach cryptography fully functioning, the BND predicted an invasion of Soviet and other Warsaw Pact troops into Czechoslovakia. CIA analysts on the other hand did not support the notion of "fraternal assistance" by the satellite states of Moscow; and US ambassador to the Soviet Union, Llewellyn Thompson, quite irritated, called the secret BND report he was given "a German fabrication". At 23:11 on 20 August 1968, BND radar operators first observed abnormal activity over Czech airspace. An agent on the ground in Prague called a BND out-station in Bavaria: "The Russians are coming." Warsaw Pact forces had moved as forecast.

However, the slowly sinking efficiency of BND in the last years of Reinhard Gehlen became evident. By 1961, it was clear that the BND employed some men who were Soviet "moles"; they had come from the earlier Gehlen Organization. One mole, Heinz Felfe, was convicted of treason in 1963. Others were not uncovered during Gehlen's term in office.

Gehlen's refusal to correct reports with questionable content strained the organization's credibility, and dazzling achievements became an infrequent commodity. A veteran agent remarked at the time that the BND pond then contained some sardines, though a few years earlier the pond had been alive with sharks.

The fact that the BND could score certain successes despite East German communist Stasi interference, internal malpractice, inefficiencies and infighting, was primarily due to select members of the staff who took it upon themselves to step up and overcome then existing maladies. Abdication of responsibility by Reinhard Gehlen was the malignancy; cronyism remained pervasive, even nepotism (at one time Gehlen had 16 members of his extended family on the BND payroll). Only slowly did the younger generation then advance to substitute new ideas for some of the bad habits caused mainly by Gehlen's semi-retired attitude and frequent holiday absences.

Gehlen retired on 30 April 1968. His successor, Bundeswehr Brigadier General Gerhard Wessel, immediately called for a program of modernization and streamlining. With political changes in the West German government and a reflection that BND was at a low level of efficiency, the service began to rebuild. Years later, Wessel's obituary in the Los Angeles Times, reported that he "is credited with modernizing the BND by hiring academic analysts and electronics specialists".

Reinhard Gehlen's memoirs, The Service, The Memoirs of General Reinhard Gehlen (English title), were published in 1977, (World Publishers, New York). A Review of the book published by the CIA makes this comment about Gehlen's achievements and management style:

"Gehlen's descriptions of most of his so-called successes in the political intelligence field are, in my opinion, either wishful thinking or self-delusion. ... Gehlen was never a good clandestine operator, nor was he a particularly good administrator. And therein lay his failures. The Gehlen Organization/BND always had a good record in the collection of military and economic intelligence on East Germany and the Soviet forces there. But this information, for the most part, came from observation and not from clandestine penetration".

==== Operation Laus ====
From the mid-1950s onwards, the GDR established a microwave radio network independent of the public network. This network served to facilitate direct, encrypted communication between the SED headquarters (Central Committee) in East Berlin and the party’s district and county leaderships across the country. The network was also used in part by the NVA.

In 1967, as part of Operation Laus (Operation louse), the BND succeeded in systematically intercepting these microwave radio links for the first time. Long-distance calls and telex messages including those from the SED district leadership in Erfurt were intercepted. The raw data obtained in this way were decrypted and analyzed at BND headquarters in Pullach. From the spring of 1968 onwards, the resulting intelligence was officially incorporated into situation reports submitted to the Federal Government (ND-Lage).

Initially, the secret telecommunications facility located in the French sector of West Berlin at the so-called Camp Foch in Berlin-Reinickendorf was able to intercept microwave radio signals. Due to the enormous volume of data and the operation's success, on-site personnel were increased several times, and in 1971, the station shifted to round-the-clock operations. Other key stations included the US-operated facility at Teufelsberg and, from 1972 onwards, numerous stations along the inner-German border. In this effort, the BND collaborated with the Bundeswehr’s signals intelligence operations under the codename "Concordia."

=== 1970s ===
The agency's second president, Gerhard Wessel, retired in 1978. According to his obituary in the Los Angeles Times in August 2002, the "former intelligence officer in Adolf Hitler's anti-Soviet spy operations" ... "is credited with modernizing the BND by hiring academic analysts and electronics specialists". The New York Times News Service obituary lauded the BND's many successes under Wessel but noted that there had been "a number of incidents of East Germans infiltrating the West German government, particularly intelligence agencies, on Gen. Wessel's watch".

==== Munich Olympic bombings ====
The kidnapping and murder of Israeli athletes at the 1972 Olympics in Munich was a watershed event for the BND, following early warnings from other countries, because it led the agency to build counter-terrorism capabilities.

==== Acquisition of Crypto AG ====
In 1970 the CIA and the BND bought Crypto AG, a Swiss information and communication security firm, for $5.75 million. The BND had already tried in 1967, in cooperation with the French intelligence service, to buy the company from its founder Robert Hagelin. The deal though fell through due to Hagelin refusing, who was already cooperating with the CIA. The CIA at the time did not cooperate with the French. In 1969, after negotiations with the US, the BND approached Hagelin again and bought the company in secret, jointly with the US intelligence service. Crypto AG produced and sold radio, Ethernet, STM, GSM, phone and fax encryption systems worldwide. Its clients included Iran, Libya, military juntas in Latin America, nuclear rivals India and Pakistan, and even the Vatican. The BND and the CIA rigged the company's devices so they could easily decipher the codes that countries used to send encrypted messages.

=== 1980s ===
==== Libyan bombings in Germany ====
In 1986, the BND deciphered the report of the Libyan Embassy in East Berlin regarding the "successful" implementation of the 1986 Berlin discotheque bombing.

==== Infiltration into Stasi HQ ====
According to an interview with Stasi defector Col. Rainer Wiegand, BND agents were assigned to use the anti-Stasi protests in East Germany in order to covertly obtain files from Building No. 2, which houses the counterespionage directorate. Wiegand assisted by providing the blueprints of the building and indicated which offices the agents should prioritize.

==== Operation Pamir ====
In the mid of 1980 the Sino-Soviet split, the conflict between Moscow and Beijing over leadership of the communist movement, raised hopes among some Western governments that China could be a potential ally against the Soviet Union. The BND sought to conduct electronic reconnaissance on Soviet troops and their nuclear missile testing grounds in Central Asia, and to intercept their radio communications. To this end, the BND cooperated with the communist Chinese government. Germany supplied modern high-frequency electronics worth over 20 million Deutsche Marks to northwestern China via front companies; there, a joint eavesdropping station was operated in the Pamir Mountains.

The USA also collaborated with China on signals intelligence operations directed against the USSR. This cooperation ended abruptly after the Beijing regime crushed the student protests in Tiananmen Square in June 1989. The CIA withdrew its eavesdropping equipment from Xinjiang province. The BND, however, reportedly stuck with the joint project; intelligence gathering in Central Asia is said to have continued through this arrangement well into the 1990s.

==== Operation Summer Rain ====
Operation Summer Rain was a highly classified joint mission involving the Federal Intelligence Service and special units of the German Armed Forces during the Soviet–Afghan War in the 1980s. The primary objective of the operation was to gather intelligence on the weapons systems utilized by Soviet forces.

=== 1990s ===
==== Spying on journalists ====
In 2005, a public scandal erupted (dubbed the Journalisten-Skandal, transl. journalists scandal) over revelations that the BND had placed a number of German journalists under surveillance since the mid-1990s, in an attempt to discover the source of information leaks from the BND about its activities relating to the war in Iraq and the "war against terror". The Bundestag constituted an investigative committee (Parlamentarischer Untersuchungsausschuss) to investigate the allegations. The committee tasked the former Federal Appellate Court (Bundesgerichtshof) judge Dr. Gerhard Schäfer as special investigator, who published a report confirming illegal BND operations involving and targeting journalists between 1993 and 2005. As a consequence, the Chancellery issued an executive order banning BND operational measures against journalists with the aim to protect the service.

The committee published a final report in 2009, which mostly confirmed the allegations, identifying the intent to protect the BND from disclosure of classified information and finding a lack of oversight within the senior leadership of the service but did not identify any responsible members from within the government.

==== Tiitinen list ====
In 1990, BND gave the Finnish Security Intelligence Service the so-called Tiitinen list—which supposedly contains names of Finns who were believed to have links to Stasi. The list was classified and locked in a safe after the Director of the Finnish Security Intelligence Service, Seppo Tiitinen, and the President of Finland, Mauno Koivisto, determined that it was based on vague hints instead of hard evidence.

==== Unlicensed armament exports ====
In the wake of the German reunification in 1991, Israel requested access to GDR weapon systems. In March 1991 a parliamentary commission decided to not give the requested weapons to Israel. Six month later, under the supervision of BND-director Volker Foertsch, the service, in conjunction with elements within the Federal Ministry of Defence, still without political clearance to do so, arranged several transfers of the requested GDR weapon systems (an SA-6 system, a ZSU-23/4 and other equipment) to Israel. The transfers were shipped using the ports and airports of Hamburg, Wilhelmshaven, Manching and Alhorn. In late 1991, a shipment labeled "agricultural machinery" was unexpectedly inspected by the Wasserschutzpolizei and weapons were discovered. A state’s attorney started an investigation and parliamentary designated BND-overseer Willy Wimmer concluded, that control over the BND has been lost. An exasperated Chancellor Helmut Kohl called the service "idiots". A few weeks later BND president Konrad Porzner and minister of defence Gerhard Stoltenberg rated the transfers as not to be problematic, since the equipment was only handed over for trials and was supposed to be returned afterwards.

==== Afghanistan-Pakistan-China SIGINT - Operation Pamir ====
The German-Chinese SIGINT station at the Pamir mountains (Operation Pamir) was intercepting Signals from Caucasus, Afghanistan and Pakistan. BND was supplying Russian intelligence bnwith data form Pamir station at Kaukasus wars. BND primarily monitored training camps for Islamist fighters involved in the Chechen War. Pamir station enabled the monitoring of Chechen military operations in the Caucasus, 2,500 kilometers away. BND also reportedly passed on information regarding refugee camps in Ingushetia and Georgia to the Russian FSB.

=== 2000s ===
==== Promoting the invasion of Iraq ====
On 5 February 2003, Colin Powell made the case for a military attack on Iraq in front of the UN Security Council. Powell supported his case with information received from the BND, instead of Mr. Hans Blix and the IAEA. The BND had collected intelligence from an informant known as Rafid al-Janabi alias CURVEBALL, who claimed Iraq would be in possession of Weapons of Mass Destruction, apart from torturing and killing over 1,000 dissidents each year, for over 20 years. Rafid was employed before and after the 2003 incident which ultimately led to the invasion of Iraq. The payments of 3,000 Euros monthly were made by a cover firm called Thiele und Friedrichs (Munich). As a result of the premature cancellation, al-Janabi filed a lawsuit at the Munich labour court and won the case.

Several former senior BND officials publicly stated that the agency had repeatedly warned the CIA not to take the information shared by CURVEBALL as fact. Hanning, the BND president at the time, even formulated his concerns about that in a letter to then CIA Director George Tenet. The CIA however ignored those warnings and presented the information as facts.

==== Peacemaking in the 2006 Lebanon War ====
Following the 2006 Lebanon War, the BND mediated secret negotiations between Israel and Hezbollah, eventually leading up to the 2008 Israel–Hezbollah prisoner exchange.

==== Fighting tax evasion ====
In the beginning of 2008, it was revealed that the BND had managed to recruit excellent sources within Liechtenstein banks and had been conducting espionage operations in the principality since the beginning of the 2000s. The BND mediated the German Finance Ministry's $7.3 million acquisition of a CD from a former employee of the LGT Group – a Liechtenstein bank owned by the country's ruling family. While the Finance Ministry defends the deal, saying it would result in several hundred millions of dollars in back tax payments, the sale remains controversial, as a government agency has paid for possibly stolen data.

==== Kosovo ====
In November 2008, three German BND agents were arrested in Kosovo for allegedly throwing a bomb at the European Union International Civilian Office, which oversees Kosovo's governance. Later the "Army of the Republic of Kosovo" had accepted responsibility for the bomb attack. Laboratory tests had shown no evidence of the BND agents' involvement. However, the Germans were released only 10 days after they were arrested. It was suspected that the arrest was a revenge by Kosovo authorities for the BND report about organized crime in Kosovo which accuses Kosovo Prime Minister Hashim Thaçi, as well as the former Prime Minister Ramush Haradinaj of far-reaching involvement in organized crime.

==== Austria ====
According to reporting in Der Standard and profil, the BND engaged in espionage in Austria between 1999 and 2006, spying on targets including the International Atomic Energy Agency, the Organization of the Petroleum Exporting Countries, the Austria Press Agency, embassies, and Austrian banks and government ministries. The government of Austria has called on Germany to clarify the allegations.

=== 2010s ===
In 2014, an employee of BND was arrested for handing over secret documents to the United States. He was suspected of handing over documents about the committee investigating the NSA spying in Germany. The German government responded to this espionage by expelling the top CIA official in Berlin. In December 2016, WikiLeaks published 2,420 documents from the BND and the Federal Office for the Protection of the Constitution (BfV). The published materials had been submitted in 2015 as part of a German parliamentary inquiry into the surveillance activities of the BND and its cooperation with the US National Security Agency. The BND has been reported to store 220 million sets of metadata every day. That is, they record with whom, when, where and for how long someone communicates. This data is supposedly collected across the world, but the exact locations remains unclear to this date. The Bundestag committee investigating the NSA spying scandal has uncovered that the German intelligence agency intercepts communications traveling via both satellites and Internet cables. It seems certain that the metadata only come from "foreign dialed traffic", that is, from telephone conversations and text messages that are held and sent via mobile phones and satellites. Of these 220 million data amassed every day, one percent is archived for 10 years "for long-term analysis". Apparently though, this long-term storage doesn't hold any Internet communications, data from social networks, or emails.

At th esame time, in 2014, BND employee Markus R. was exposed as a double agent for the CIA. Over a period of six years, he had sold more than 200 documents, some of them top-secret, including information regarding the Bundestag’s NSA inquiry committee to the United States. In 2016, he was sentenced to eight years in prison for treason.

==== Austria ====
From 2017 onwards, the right-wing radical FPÖ was part of governments in Austria; its representatives maintain a close relationship with Russia. BND and other western intelligent agency were afraid, that sensible shared informations will be leaked to Russia by FPÖ-networks. Media outlets reported that BND and others withdrew significantly from the Club de Berne and temporarily isolated sensitive operations.

=== 2020s ===
According to information that has since become public, the BND misjudged the concrete risk of a Russian attack on Ukraine in 2022. Economics Minister Robert Habeck openly criticized the fact that the BND had completely misjudged the situation in February 2022. While US and British intelligence agencies issued precise warnings and even correctly predicted the time of the attac, BND downplayed the risk. Habeck stated that he had received information from foreign partners much earlier and more precisely than from his own country's intelligence service.

BND President Bruno Kahl had traveled to Ukraine for talks shortly before the invasion. When Russian bombers launched their attack on February 24, 2022, the BND chief found himself stranded and had to be evacuated overland to Poland in a security convoy under dramatic circumstances.

==== Ukraine support ====
In April 2022 BND shipped own encryption technology to Kyiv to ensure secure data transfer from Germany to Ukraine. It was initially emphasized that no targeting data would be provided, so that Germany would not become a party to the war.

BND support Ukraine mainly by SIGINT and IMINT. BND uses own interceting stations in Germany as well as stations closer to Ukraine border from partner agencys. The BND had acquired atrocities committed by Russian military forces. Especially at the beginning of the war, BND intercepted unencrypted or inadequately secured voice and data radio communications from Russian units. BND intercept logs from 2022 gained international attention; in them, Russian soldiers spoke openly over the radio about the targeted killing of civilians in the Kyiv suburb of Bucha. BND also provided satellite images form the place where the war crimes happened.

==== Treason cases ====
In December 2022, a high-ranking employee of the BND was arrested on alleged treason. Carsten L. is said to have disclosed information from his professional activity to the Russian domestic secret service FSB. The Public Prosecutor General accuses him of treason (Landesverrat) because it is said to have been state secrets. Prosecutors alleged L. that he had given intelligence about the war in Ukraine and the Wagner mercenary group to Russia and received roughly €400,000 for that.

Another major BND scandal occurred in 2026: On October 6, 2026, former BND President August Hanning was arrested on suspicion of high treason and the disclosure of state secrets. He allegedly paid his former employee, Manfred D., to obtain up-to-date secret situation reports from the BND for use in his commercial consulting work. He is also said to have written reports for foreign intelligence services using his knowledge.

== New headquarters ==
The new BND headquarters in Berlin, near the former Berlin Wall, was completed in 2017. At the official opening in February 2019, Angela Merkel, then Chancellor of Germany, made this statement: "In an often very confusing world, now, more urgently than ever, Germany needs a strong and efficient foreign intelligence service". At the time, some 4,000 employees were expected to work from this location, moving here from the former headquarters in Pullach, a suburb of Munich. The agency's total number of employees, in Germany and other countries, was approximately 6,500.

== Structure ==
The Bundesnachrichtendienst is divided into the following departments:

1. Regionale Auswertung und Beschaffung A (LA) und Regionale Auswertung und Beschaffung B (LB) (Regional Analysis and Procurement, A/B countries)
2. Internationaler Terrorismus und Internationale Organisierte Kriminalität (TE) (Terrorism and International Organised Crime)
3. Proliferation, ABC-Waffen, Wehrtechnik (TW) (Proliferation, NBC Weapons)
4. Technische Aufklärung (TA) (Signal Intelligence)
5. Gesamtlage und unterstützende Fachdienste (GU) (Situation Centre)
1. Informationstechnik (IT) (Information Technology)
2. Zentralabteilung (ZY) (Central Services)
3. Eigensicherung (SI) (Security)
4. Umzug (UM) (Relocation [to Berlin])

== Signals intelligence ==
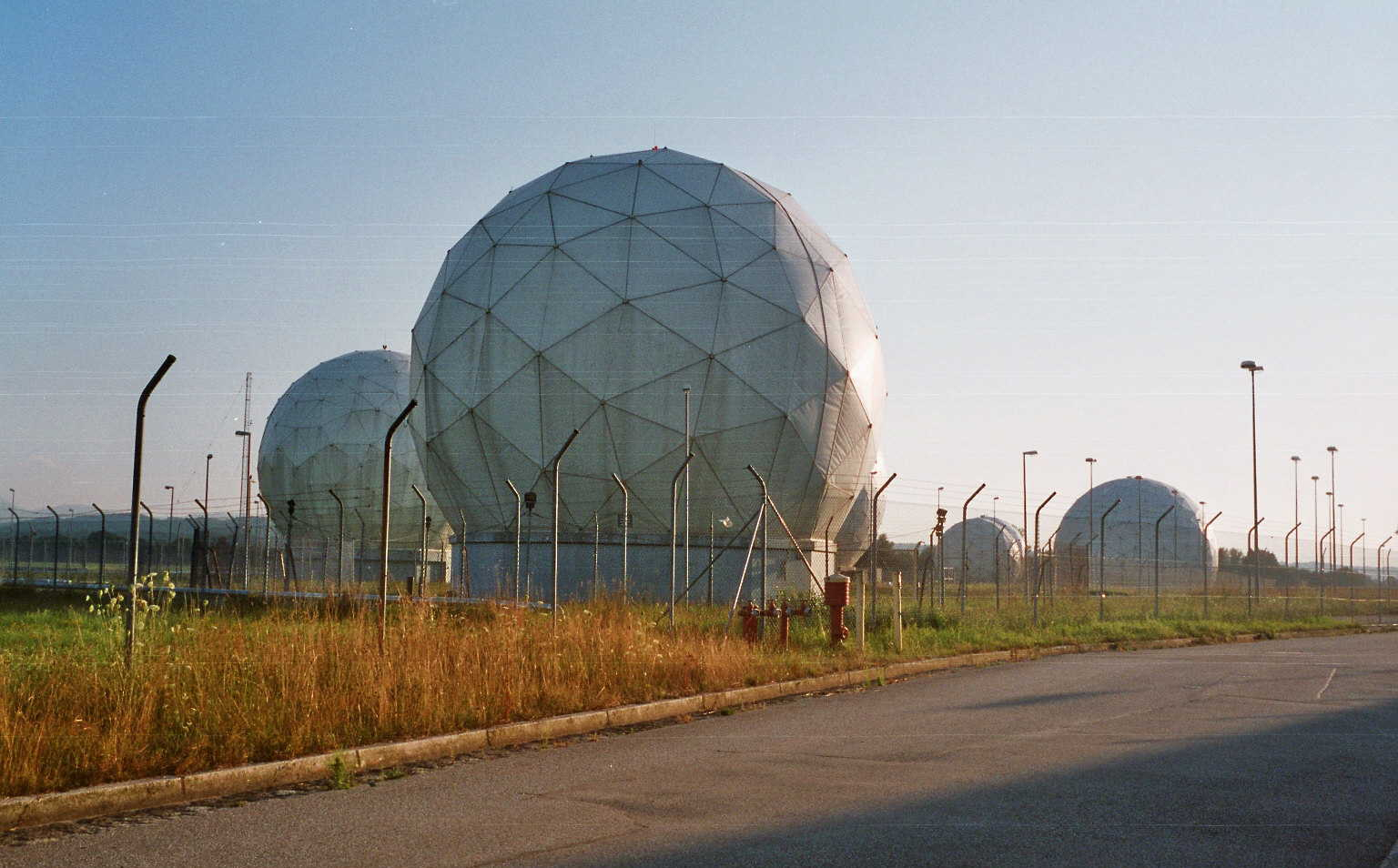
Radome of Fernmeldeverkehrstelle des Bundesnachrichtendiensts (BND-code name: Hortensien III, short: 3D30) at summer 2006. The system at Bad Aibling Station was part of the NSA ECHELON-Network until 2004.

BND is responsible for the global monitoring, collection, and processing of information and data for foreign and domestic intelligence and counterintelligence purposes with content of German interest. The department of Technische Aufklärung (TA) is the most significant unit within BND and has the highest number of employees. The department is located at the former BND HQ in Pullach, Bavaria. One of the major SIGINT stations after WW2 was Bad Aibling Station, which was operated for decades in cooperation with the National Security Agency (NSA). Furthermore, Station Gablingen, Station Husum, Station Rheinhausen, Station Schöningen, Station Starnberg-Söcking and Station Stockdorf.

BND does not operate its own satellites but uses instead the reconnaissance satellites of the Bundeswehr (SARAH-system), foreign partners, or commercial providers. The BND's first proprietary satellite project started in 2016, with systems built by OHB, and was supposed to have entered service in 2022. After investigations by German public media, the start was delayed, such that BND was likely to be unable to launch satellites into space until 2025.

=== Internet interception ===
BND intercepts the data traffic of DE-CIX in Frankfurt, the largest European hub for internet traffic.

Details concerning the BND's collaboration with the NSA between 2004 and 2008 have been published. In Frankfurt, Internet data was captured by filters and sent via a Deutsche Telekom line to the BND headquarters in Pullach and from there to the Bad Aibling station, where the NSA and BND have a joint headquarters.

== Presidents of the BND ==
The head of the Bundesnachrichtendienst is its President. The following persons have held this office since 1956:

Presidents of the Bundesnachrichtendienst (BND)
| | Name (lived) | Beginning of service | End of service |
| 1 | Reinhard Gehlen (1902–1979) | 1 April 1956 | 30 April 1968 |
| 2 | Gerhard Wessel (1913–2002) | 1 May 1968 | 31 December 1978 |
| 3 | Klaus Kinkel (1936–2019) | 1 January 1979 | 26 December 1982 |
| 4 | Eberhard Blum (1919–2003) | 27 December 1982 | 31 July 1985 |
| 5 | Heribert Hellenbroich (1937–2014) | 1 August 1985 | 27 August 1985 |
| 6 | Hans-Georg Wieck (1928–2024) | 4 September 1985 | 2 October 1990 |
| 7 | Konrad Porzner (1935–2021) | 3 October 1990 | 31 March 1996 |
| 8 | Gerhard Güllich (b. 1938) (interim) | 1 April 1996 | 4 June 1996 |
| 9 | Hansjörg Geiger (b. 1942) | 4 June 1996 | 17 December 1998 |
| 10 | August Hanning (b. 1946) | 17 December 1998 | 30 November 2005 |
| 11 | Ernst Uhrlau (b. 1946) | 1 December 2005 | 7 December 2011 |
| 12 | Gerhard Schindler (b. 1952) | 7 December 2011 | 1 July 2016 |
| 13 | Bruno Kahl (b. 1962) | 1 July 2016 | 14 September 2025 |
| 14 | Martin Jäger (b. 1964) | 15 September 2025 | Incumbent |

The president of the BND is a federal Beamter paid according to BBesO order B, B9, which is in payment the equivalent of a lieutenant general.

=== Deputy ===
The President of the BND has three deputies: one Vice President, one Vice President for Military Affairs (Since December 2003), and one Vice President for Central Functions and Modernization (Possibly Since 2013). Prior to December 2003, there was only one Vice President. The following persons have held this office since 1957:

Vice Presidents of the Bundesnachrichtendienst (BND)
| | Name (lived) | Beginning of service | End of service |
| 1 | Hans-Heinrich Worgitzky (1907–1969) | 24 May 1957 | 1967 |
| 2 | Horst Wendland (1912–1968) | | 8 October 1968 (suicide) |
| 3 | Dieter Blötz (1931–1987) | 4 May 1970 | August 1979 |
| 4 | Norbert Klusak (1936–1986) | 1 April 1980 | 27 February 1986 |
| 5 | Paul Münstermann (1932–2010) | 1986 | 27 August 1994 |
| 6 | Gerhard Güllich (b. 1938) (interim) | 1994 | 1996 |
| 7 | Rainer Kesselring (1934–2013) | 18 June 1996 | September 1998 |
| 8 | Siegfried Barth (b. 1935/1936) | September 1998 | July 2001 |
| 9 | Rudolf Adam (b. 1948) | July 2001 | 31 March 2004 |
| 10 | Werner Schowe (b. 1944), military affairs VP | 15 December 2003 | 30 September 2005 |
| 11 | Rüdiger von Fritsch-Seerhausen (b. 1953) | 1 May 2004 | 2007 |
| 12 | Georg Freiherr von Brandis (1948–2021), military affairs VP | 4 October 2005 | February 2008 |
| 13 | Arndt Freytag von Loringhoven (b. 1956) | 2007 | 2010 |
| 14 | Armin Hasenpusch (1948–2014), military affairs VP | 2008 | 2010 |
| 15 | Werner Ober (b. 1948), central functions and modernization VP | 2008 | 2013 |
| 16 | Géza Andreas von Geyr (b. 1962) | 2010 | 2014 |
| 17 | Guido Müller (b. 1966), central functions and modernization VP | 2013 | October 2018 |
| 18 | Michael Klor-Berchtold (b. 1962) | 2014 | 2016 |
| 19 | Ole Diehl (b. 1964) | 2016 | June 2019 |
| 20 | Norbert Stier (b. 1953), military affairs VP | 2010 | 2015 |
| 21 | Werner Sczesny (b. 1960), military affairs VP | 2016 | January 2021 |
| 22 | Michael Baumann (b. 1956), central functions VP and permanent deputy | January 2019 | October 2022 |
| 23 | Tania Freiin von Uslar-Gleichen (b. 1964), VP | July 2019 | February 2021 |
| 24 | Wolfgang Wien (b. 1963), VP and senior officer | July 2021 | September 2023 |
| 25 | Ole Diehl (b. 1964), VP | March 2021 | Incumbent |
| 26 | Philipp Wolff (b. 1972), central functions VP | November 2022 | May 2025 |
| 27 | Dag Baehr (b. 1965), VP and senior officer | September 2023 | Incumbent |
| 28 | Gabriele Monschau (b. 1974), central functions VP and permanent deputy | Juli 2025 | Incumbent |

== See also ==
- Agency 114
- Abwehr
- Federal Constitutional Court of Germany
- List of intelligence agencies of Germany
- Operation Eikonal
- Federal Ministry of the Interior (Germany)
