= Kerben, Germany =

Kerben
- Municipality
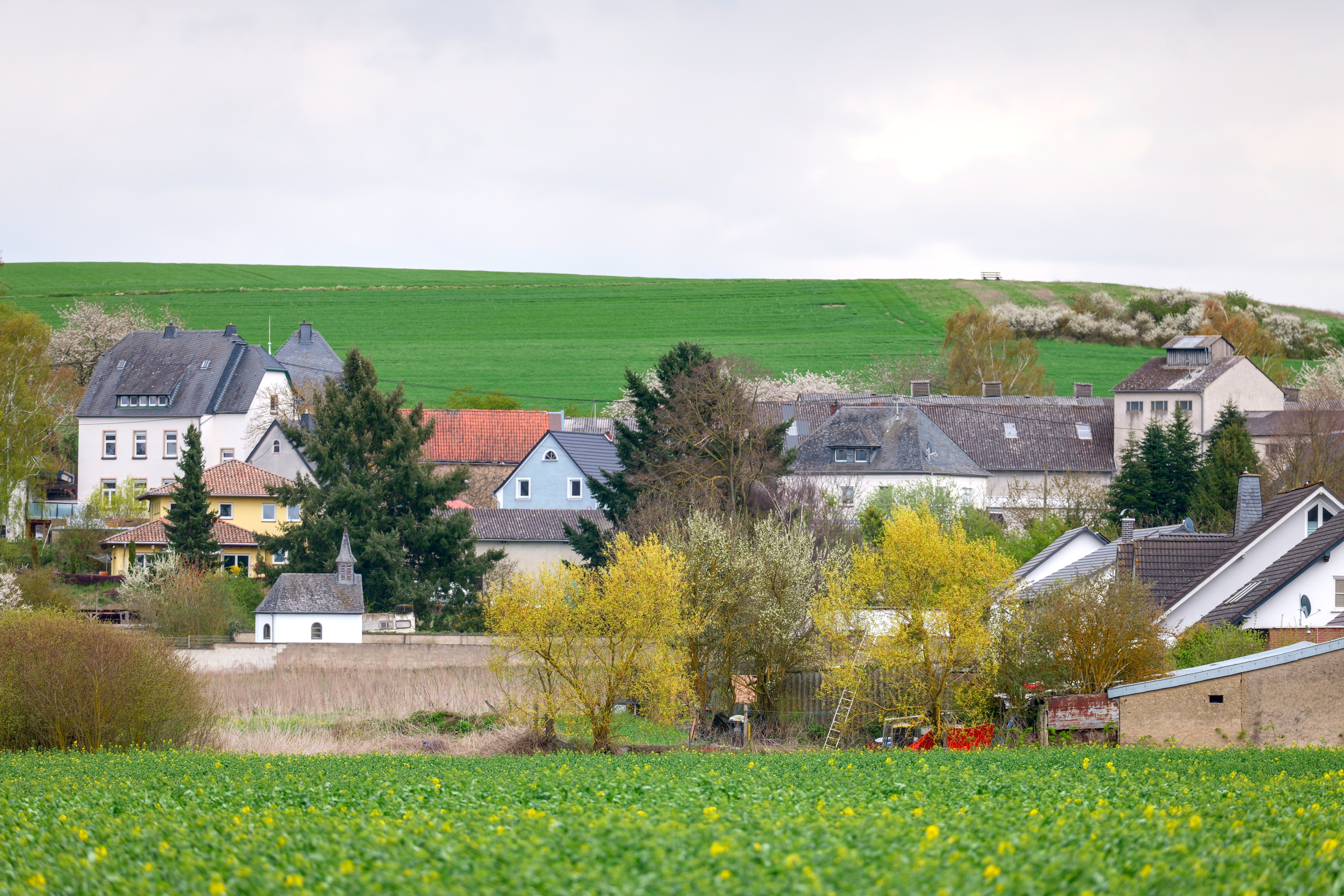

- Coat of arms

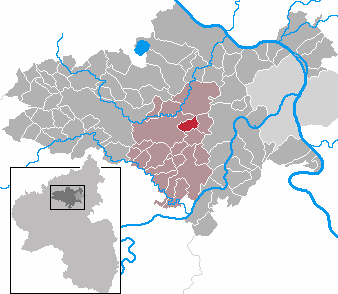
- Location of Kerben within Mayen-Koblenz district
- Interactive map of Kerben
- Location within Germany Location within Rhineland-Palatinate
- Coordinates: 50°18′41″N 7°21′23″E
- Country: Germany
- State: Rhineland-Palatinate
- District: Mayen-Koblenz
- Municipal assoc.: Maifeld

Government
  - Mayor (2019–24): Helmut Eberz

Area
  - Total: 4.71 km^{2} (1.82 sq mi)
- Elevation: 210 m (690 ft)

Population (2025-12-31)
  - Total: 535
  - Density: 114/km^{2} (294/sq mi)
- Time zone: UTC+01:00 (CET)
  - Summer (DST): UTC+02:00 (CEST)
- Postal codes: 56295
- Dialling codes: 02654
- Vehicle registration: MYK
- Website: www.kerben.de

Kerben (German pronunciation: [ˈkɛʁbn̩]) is a municipality in the district of Mayen-Koblenz in Rhineland-Palatinate, western Germany.

== Transport ==
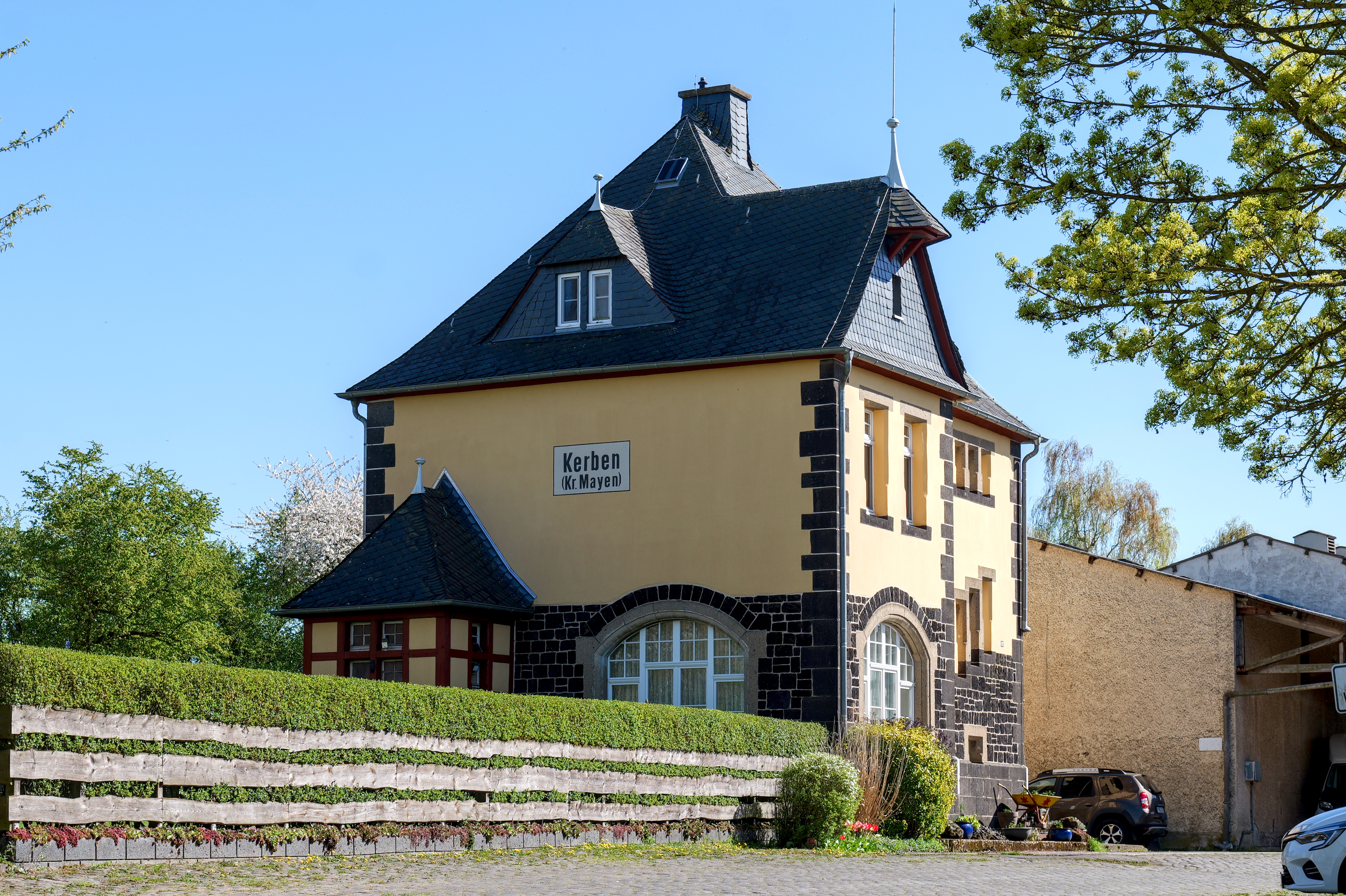
Former Kerben train stop

Kerben is connected to the local bus network and located in the area of the transport association Verkehrsverbund Rhein-Mosel (VRM)

In the past, Kerben had a stop on the Koblenz-Lützel - Mayen Ost railway, which is out of service today.
