= Kollig =

- Municipality
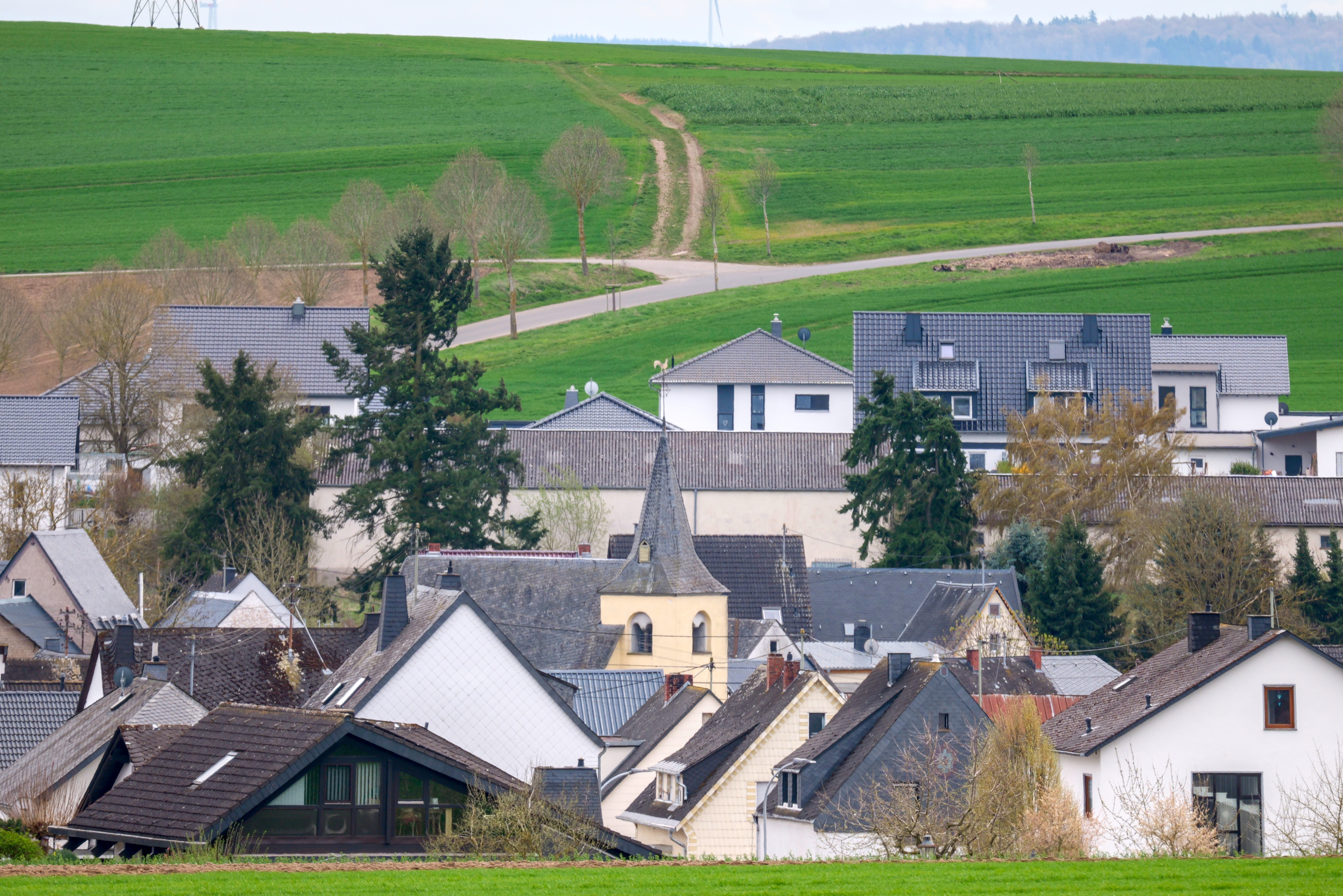

- Coat of arms

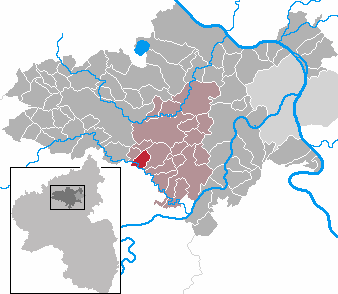
- Location of Kollig within Mayen-Koblenz district
- Interactive map of Kollig
- Location within Germany Location within Rhineland-Palatinate
- Coordinates: 50°15′59″N 7°16′51″E
- Country: Germany
- State: Rhineland-Palatinate
- District: Mayen-Koblenz
- Municipal assoc.: Maifeld

Government
  - Mayor (2019–24): Robert Ollig

Area
  - Total: 5.01 km^{2} (1.93 sq mi)
- Elevation: 300 m (980 ft)

Population (2025-12-31)
  - Total: 606
  - Density: 121/km^{2} (313/sq mi)
- Time zone: UTC+01:00 (CET)
  - Summer (DST): UTC+02:00 (CEST)
- Postal codes: 56751
- Dialling codes: 02654
- Vehicle registration: MYK

Kollig (German pronunciation: [ˈkɔlɪç]) is a municipality in the district of Mayen-Koblenz in Rhineland-Palatinate, western Germany. The historic watermill Kolliger Mühle is located in the municipality.
