= Agency 114 =

Agency 114 (German: Dienststelle 114) was a Cold War-era clandestine front of the postwar West German intelligence agency, the Bundesnachrichtendienst (BND), which served as the main entrance point, into the field of domestic counterintelligence, for former Nazis, including war criminals active in the Holocaust who have never been brought to justice.

== Origin ==
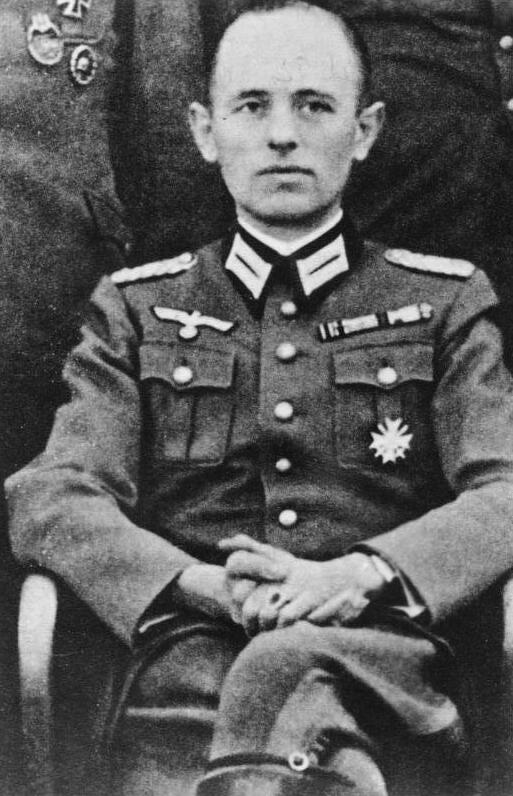
Colonel Reinhard Gehlen, c. 1943

Following the onset of the Cold War, for over twenty years West Germany did not prosecute many war criminals. Thousands of them led normal lives, often in positions of prominence, power, and wealth, protected by Chancellor Konrad Adenauer, who held that office from 1949 to 1963. Agency 114 was established within the Gehlen Organization soon after World War II. The United States Army, seeking intelligence on activities of Soviet agents within the American-occupied zone of Germany, brought the assignment to Reinhard Gehlen, previously of the Wehrmacht, who proceeded to initiate the Agency 114 operation.

== Activities ==
At the height of the Cold War in the mid-1960s, Agency 114 was merged into the BND, successor to the Gehlen Organization. Agency 114 was located in Karlsruhe, at Zimmerle & Co., ostensibly a roller-blind company that served as its front. Aside from Soviet counterintelligence activities, Agency 114 also began monitoring domestic leftists and pacifists.

By this time, Agency 114 was headed by Alfred Benzinger, nicknamed "der Dicke" (Fatty), a former sergeant in the Wehrmacht secret military police, the Geheime Feldpolizei. Former Nazis who worked in Agency 114 included Konrad Fiebig and Walter Kurreck.
