= Gering, Germany =

Gering
- Municipality
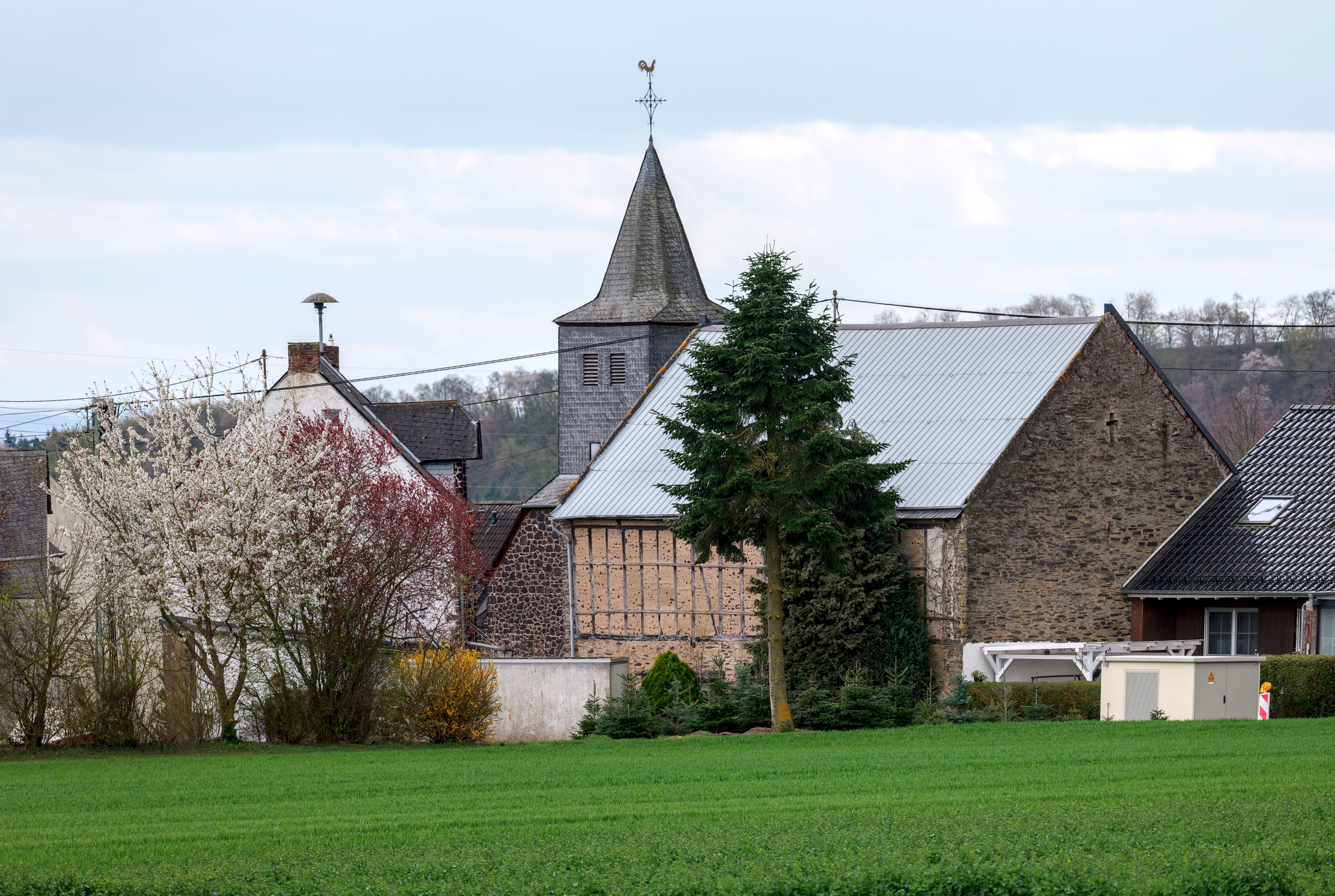

- Coat of arms

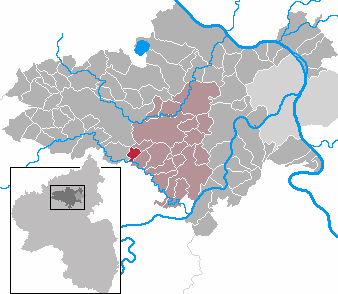
- Location of Gering within Mayen-Koblenz district
- Interactive map of Gering
- Location within Germany Location within Rhineland-Palatinate
- Coordinates: 50°16′32″N 7°16′01″E
- Country: Germany
- State: Rhineland-Palatinate
- District: Mayen-Koblenz
- Municipal assoc.: Maifeld

Government
  - Mayor (2019–24): Thomas Welter

Area
  - Total: 2.9 km^{2} (1.1 sq mi)
- Elevation: 330 m (1,080 ft)

Population (2025-12-31)
  - Total: 413
  - Density: 140/km^{2} (370/sq mi)
- Time zone: UTC+01:00 (CET)
  - Summer (DST): UTC+02:00 (CEST)
- Postal codes: 56751
- Dialling codes: 02654
- Vehicle registration: MYK
- Website: gering-maifeld.de

Gering (German pronunciation: [ˈɡeːʁɪŋ]) is a municipality in the district of Mayen-Koblenz in Rhineland-Palatinate, western Germany.
