= List of spies in World War II =

Notable spies and their codenames

The following is an incomplete list of notable spies during World War II.

== Spies for China ==
Person	Notes	Reference(s)
Lo Ta-yu	Chinese intelligence officer recruited in 1935 by Chi Shi-ying’s Northeast Association and the September 18th Alliance. He later led underground anti-Japanese operations in Manchuria until his arrest by Japanese forces in 1945. Codename: 魏中誠	
Liang Su-yung	Joined Chi Shih-ying’s intelligence network in 1939 under Lo Ta-yu’s leadership, operating within Japanese-occupied Manchuria and transmitting information to Chongqing. Codename: 王桂林	

== Spies for France ==
Person	Notes	Reference(s)
Peggy Taylor	Taylor was a French spy who shot and killed a German Gestapo colonel when she was 21.	4
Gabrielle Bonheur (spy)	Gabrielle was a French Nazi spy who reported information to French colony. Was later accused.	

== Spies for Germany ==
Person	Notes	Reference(s)
Mathilde Carré	Carré was a double agent.	
Coco Chanel	Chanel was a Nazi spy, proven in declassified documents by historian Hal Vaughan in 2011.	
Harold Cole	Cole betrayed the French resistance. He was shot and killed by French police in 1946.	
Astrid Dövle Dollis Dahlgren	She was a Norwegian employed by the Germans.	
Fritz Duquesne	was a former Boer soldier and big-game hunter who had spied for Imperial Germany in WWI, and was the ringleader of the Duquesne Spy Ring in the US during WWII .	
Jessie Jordan	Scottish hairdesser actually arrested in 1937 and imprisoned until she could be deported	
Horst Kopkow	Kopkow was responsible for the deaths of hundreds of captured Allied agents.	
Elyesa Bazna	Code name Cicero; worked for the British ambassador in Ankara and photographed many top-secrets documents for Nazi Germany	
Edward Kerling	Kerling was the leader of Operation Pastorius. Executed in 1942.	
Herbert Hans Haupt	Haupt was a member of Operation Pastorius. Executed in 1942.	
Richard Kauder	Kauder was the leader of the Max and Moritz Networks supplying rumours and convincing made-up reports on Soviet Union and Mediterranean region from Sofia	

== Spies for Italy ==
Person	Notes	Reference(s)
Carmelo Borg Pisani	Carmelo Borg Pisani was a Maltese-born artist and Italian Fascist who, on being discovered during an espionage mission in Malta, was found guilty by a British war tribunal and executed for treason.	
Rodolfo Siviero	Siviero was an Italian secret agent, art historian and intellectual, most notable for his important work in recovering artworks stolen from Italy during the Second World War as part of the 'Nazi plunder'.	
Pino Lella	Lella claimed to have led Jews fleeing Italy through the Alps into Switzerland to freedom and later, as a Nazi, to have passed information to the Italian resistance. Critics note that none of his claims have been corroborated, either by those he claimed to rescue or by the Italian resistance and that such claims might have been self-serving fabrications to avoid recriminations after World War II for enlisting as a Nazi.	

== Spies for the Netherlands ==
Person	Notes	Reference(s)
Dirk Klop	Klop was killed in the Venlo Incident.	

== Spies for Japan ==
Person	Notes	Reference(s)
Frederick Rutland	Was a former WWI British naval aviation officer who was paid by the Japanese to spy on American military aviation developments in California and Hawaii before Pearl Harbor.	
William Forbes-Sempill, 19th Lord Sempill	Was a Scottish Peer and British Royal Air Force Officer who passed military secrets to the Japanese before Pearl Harbor.	
Velvalee Dickinson	Known as the Doll Woman, Dickinson used her New York City Doll shop as a base of operations to spy on the US Navy and send stenographic messages to her Japanese handlers in South America. She was caught by the FBI in 1944 and was sentenced to ten years in prison.	
Patrick Stanley Vaughan Heenan	Heenan was a British Indian Army Captain who used radio equipment to transmit intelligence to Japanese forces during the Battle of Malay. His espionage was discovered by his fellow officers, and he was summarily executed before the British defeat in the Battle of Singapore.	

== Spies for Poland ==
Person	Notes	Reference(s)
Roman Czerniawski	Czerniawski was a D-Day spy.	
Jan Kowalewski	Kowaleski helped Poland achieve victory in the 1920 Battle of Warsaw.	
Andrzej Kowerski (also called Andrew Kennedy)	Kowerski was a Lieutenant for Poland during the war.	
Kazimierz Leski	Leski was a pilot during the war. He was captured and went to prison, and then he escaped.	

== Spies for the Soviet Union ==
Person	Notes	Reference(s)
Alexandru Nicolschi	He was a Soviet spy.	
Richard Sorge	Worked in Japan and Germany; Passed Information about Japan were crucial for the Soviet victory in Operation Barbarossa	

== Spies for Sweden ==
Person	Notes	Reference(s)
Karin Lannby	Lannby was a spy for Sweden.	

== Spies for the United Kingdom ==
Person	Notes	Reference(s)
Sverre Bergh	Bergh spied on missile facilities in Germany. He illegally moved German plans Wasserfall surface-to-air-missiles out of Germany.	
Blanche Charlet	Charlet worked with SOE, a British organization that went against the Axis powers.	
Roman Czerniawski	Czerniawski was a D-Day spy.	
Madeleine Damerment	Damerment worked for SOE and was later shot.	
Claude Dansey	Dansey was assistant chief of the SIS.	
Wilfred Dunderdale	Dunderdale was a commander during the war.	
Ian Fleming	Fleming was a Lieutenant Commander RNVR in the British NID and was a key member of the NID 17.	
Juan Pujol García (a.k.a. Garbo and Alaric)	A Spanish double agent loyal to Great Britain, García played a key role deceiving Nazi Germany during Operation Fortitude, delaying reinforcements from Nazi Germany to Normandy.	
Tor Glad (a.k.a. Jeff)		
Kurt Glauber	Glauber was a Jewish Austrian who escaped to Britain. He joined MI6. On his second mission, part of which involved gathering information on Nazi Nuclear developments, he was betrayed. Glauber was severely brutalized by the Nazis for being both a Jew and a British spy, refused to reveal any information. He was murdered in Mauthausen Concentration Camp.	
Graham Greene	Greene was involved in the SIS (also known as MI6).	
Virginia Hall	Hall was a spy for the SOE, American OSS and the CIA. Note that the OSS was a precursor to the CIA.	
Mary Katherine Herbert	Herbert worked as a translator at Air Ministry in London after working with the British Embassy.	
Ron Jeffery		
Noor Inayat Khan	Khan was a SOE agent and became the first female wireless operator to be sent into occupied France to aid the French Resistance during the war.	
Andrzej Kowerski (also called Andrew Kennedy)	Kowerski was a Lieutenant for Poland during the war.	
Lionel Lee	Lee was a British Jew. He joined MI6. On his second mission, he was betrayed. and captured. Lee was murdered in the Gross-Rosen Concentration Camp.	
Patrick Leigh Fermor	Leigh Fermor was an SOE operative in Heraklion, Crete, who abducted the German General Heinrich Kreipe to Egypt.	
Stewart Menzies		
Merlin Minshall	Minshall worked for Ian Fleming as a spy.	
John "Helge" Moe (a.k.a. Mutt)		
Eileen Nearne	Nearne was a SOE for the United Kingdom.	
Jacqueline Nearne		
Paddy O'Sullivan	O'Sullivan was a member of the Women's Auxiliary Air Force.	
John Pendlebury	Pendlebury worked for the British intelligence.	
Paddy Ridsdale	Ridsdale was Ian Fleming's secretary.	
Peter Smithers	Smithers helped Ian Fleming collect German spies in Britain.	
Violette Szabo		
Halina Szymańska	Szymańska had a French identity card, which identified her as a Marie Clenat. She used this card to aid Britain.	
Col. Ted Tingling	Tinlin was a colonel for the British intelligence.	
Jona von Ustinov	Ustinov was a British spy.	
Valentine Patrick Terrell Vivian		
Pearl Witherington	Witherington was known by many names.	
Forest Frederick Edward "Tommy" Yeo-Thomas	Yeo-Thomas was a SOE agent.	

== Spies for the United States ==
Person	Notes	Reference(s)
Juliette May Alexander	Alexander was an American spy who gathered intel from German troops occupying France. She remained in Clermont-Ferrand for nearly two years, and reported her findings back to the US military.	
Moe Berg	Morris Berg was an American catcher and coach in Major League Baseball, who later served as a spy for the Office of Strategic Services during World War II.	
Julia Child	Child worked for the OSS on the development of shark repellents. This was to ensure that sharks would not explode ordnance targeting German U-boats.	
William J. Donovan	Donovan was the head of the OSS.	
Helias Doundoulakis	Doundoulakis was a spy in the Secret Intelligence Branch (SI) of the Office of Strategic Services, sent to Salonica Greece.	
Arthur Goldberg	Goldberg was a United Nations ambassador.	
Virginia Hall	Hall was a spy for the SOE, American OSS and the CIA. Note that the OSS was a precursor to the CIA.	
Sterling Hayden	Hayden was an agent for the OSS.	
Rene Joyeuse	Joyeuse was an agent/operative for the OSS, who after the war became a physician and researcher and Co-founder of the American Trauma Society.	
Sidney Mashbir	Mashbir headed the top secret intelligence gathering organization Allied Translator and Interpreter Section during WWII. In 1942, Colonel Mashbir working with Ellis M. Zacharias created the first draft for the implementing directives for the creation of the CIA. Commander Zacharias later became the Deputy Chief of Naval Intelligence.	
Arthur M. Schlesinger, Jr.	He worked for the OSS.	
Jim Thompson	Thompson served as an operative in the OSS.	
Stephanie Czech Rader	U.S. Army Capt. Stephanie Czech Rader was X-2. She moved around Poland, tracking troop movements and ferrying sensitive documents..	
Ellis M. Zacharias	Zacharias became Deputy Chief of Naval Intelligence	
Nicholas Deak	Agent for the OSS	

== Those who 'leaked' stories to the media, as opposed to spying for a country ==
Person	Notes	Reference(s)
Ernest Cuneo	Cuneo was a liaison officer who revealed stories about the United States commanders.	

== Spies for other countries ==
Person	Notes	Reference(s)
Jane Horney	Horney was a Swedish spy for the Soviet Union.	

== See also ==
- List of Japanese spies, 1930–45
- Commanders of World War II
- World War II casualties
