= Eberhard Blum =

- Born: 28 April 1919; Kiel, Germany
- Died: 9 July 2003 (aged 84); Stuttgart, Germany
- Military career
- Conflicts: World War II

Eberhard Blum (April 28, 1919 – July 9, 2003), born in Kiel, was the fourth head of the German Federal Intelligence Bureau (BND). He served for the Wehrmacht on the Eastern front during World War II, last in the position of a Rittmeister. After the war he finished his university studies in law and state science and in 1947 joined the Gehlen Organization, the precursor of the BND. He became personal consultant to Reinhard Gehlen under the codename HARTWIG.

From 1961 to 1964 he was head of the subdivision "Personnel" of the BND. 1964 to 1968 he became resident spy of the BND in London.

After the period in London he returned to Pullach as head of Department IV Administration (Abeitlung IV Verwaltung), a position he kept until 1970 when major disputes with the then BND president Gerhard Wessel arose and he was transferred as resident spy to Washington where he remained until 1982.

He overtook the position as head of the Bundesnachrichtendienst in 1982 and remained in office until 1985.

Blum died on July 9, 2003, in Stuttgart.

== Footnotes ==
Government offices
| Preceded by Klaus Kinkel | President of the Federal Intelligence Bureau; 1982–1985 | Succeeded by Heribert Hellenbroich |
