= Heinz Felfe =

German espionage agent

- Born: Heinz Paul Johann Felfe; 18 March 1918; Dresden, Saxony, Germany
- Died: 8 May 2008 (aged 90); Berlin, Germany
- Occupation: Espionage
- Political party: NSDAP (1936-1945)
- Spouse: Yes
- Children: 2

Heinz Paul Johann Felfe (18 March 1918 – 8 May 2008) was a German spy.

At various times he worked for the intelligence services of Nazi Germany, Great Britain, the Soviet Union, and West Germany. It is still not clear when he started working for Soviet intelligence, but it is known that between 1951 and 1961 he was a highly effective double agent, supplying important intelligence received in the course of his work for West German Intelligence to the Soviet Union.

At the age of eighteen in 1936, Felfe served in the SS, reaching the rank of Obersturmführer (first lieutenant).

== Life ==
=== Early years ===
Heinz Felfe was born in Dresden, in the southern part of what was then the central part of Germany. His father was a Criminal Investigation officer (Kriminalbeamter). On leaving school Felfe undertook an apprenticeship as a precision mechanic. At school he joined the Nazi Schoolchildren's League (NSS / Nationalsozialistischer Schülerbund): at this time Adolf Hitler was still known only as a highly effective opposition politician. In 1931, the year of his thirteenth birthday, Felfe joined the Hitler Youth association. Two years later, in January 1933, the NSDAP (Nazi Party) took power in Germany, and in 1936, the year of his eighteenth birthday, Heinz Felfe became one of Germany's (by then) nearly four million Nazi party members (membership number 3,710,348).

=== National socialist years ===
1936 was also the year in which Heinz Felfe joined the SS / Schutzstaffel (membership number 286,288). In 1939 he began working as a personal bodyguard for prominent party members, which also involved his receiving training as an official in the Criminal Investigation Department.

==== German intelligence ====
Felfe joined the Intelligence service (Der Sicherheitsdienst) in 1943. In August 1943 he was posted to Switzerland where, as head of the agency's important Swiss unit, his responsibilities included disseminating forged British pound notes as part of a broader strategy to undermine the British currency internationally. Towards the end of the war he was promoted to the rank of SS-Obersturmführer (roughly equivalent to a First lieutenant) and, in December 1944, transferred to the Netherlands with a mandate to organise subversive groups behind what was now becoming the allied front line. On 8 March 1945, Felfe allegedly participated in the mass executions of 263 hostages in reprisal for the assassination attempt on Hanns Albin Rauter. According to a credible 1969 press report much of his energy while in the Netherlands implied a personal rivalry with his father, a Dresden-based Criminal Investigation Officer of evidently overbearing character, who was by origin a member of Germany's Sorbian ethnic minority. As the German war machine fell back across Europe, Felfe asked the Gestapo to harass members of the Sorbian minority back in his country's Saxon heartland.

=== After the war ===
==== British intelligence ====
He was captured by the British Army in 1945, and spent the seventeen months from May 1945 till October 1946 as a British prisoner of war. He at some point had learned to speak English fluently. Under interrogation in July 1945, at Blauwkapel (near Utrecht), Felfe stated that he had been "an ardent Nazi". This was nothing more than the British could have determined for themselves by rummaging through the relevant German records, but the egotistical candor of his assertion was sufficiently unusual for the British to flag it in their own files as well as in the record of the interrogation passed along to the CIA. In 1946 he agreed to work for British Intelligence ("MI6") in Münster. His assignments included reporting on Communist activism at Cologne and Bonn universities. He continued to work for the British at least till 1949, but amid growing suspicion by his handlers that he might also be working for the Soviet intelligence services. By 1949 Felfe had also found time to study for and obtain a Law degree from Bonn university.

==== Soviet intelligence ====
At some point between 1949 and 1951 he was indeed recruited to work for Soviet intelligence. Subsequent CIA reconstructions of the narrative indicate that he might have been working less formally for the Soviets from 1948 or earlier. However, Felfe is believed to have become a "full blown" Soviet agent only in September 1951, following a meeting in late 1949 or early 1950 with Hans Clemens, a former colleague from their days in German Intelligence. By this time, however, Felfe had already been supplying Clemens with information for the Soviets. Both Felfe and Clemens were from Dresden: the recruitment of both men was directed by the KGB office in Dresden. Later CIA reports noted that during the years directly following the war the Soviets had systematically targeted former agents of the Nazi Intelligence services, and that they had particular success in recruiting people from Dresden because of bitterness against the British and Americans resulting from the very high level of civilian deaths and suffering caused by the destructive fire bombing of that city in February 1945. The intense bombing of Dresden had been controversial even in London and Washington.

Felfe's Soviet handlers used for him the code name "Paul". Meanwhile, in April 1950 the British "dropped" him, "for serious oparational [sic] and personal security reasons". Agent "Paul" continued to work under the case officer Vitaly Korotkov for the Soviet Main Intelligence Directorate until his arrest in November 1961. Even after his arrest he managed to brief the KGB about his ongoing interrogation, using invisible ink to make additions to his private letters.

==== Refugee screening ====
In 1950/51 Heinz Felfe was also working for the West German government in Bonn with the Federal Ministry for intra-German relations. The zones of occupation agreed upon between the principal allied leaders at Potsdam had by now crystallized in such a way that the Soviet occupation zone had been developed into a separate stand-alone state; for the first few years after 1945 under Soviet administration and, since the young country's foundation in 1949, as the German Democratic Republic (while still able to access the fraternal security advice and practical support of several hundred thousand resident Soviet troops). The frontier between the two German states later became famously fortified, but through the later 1940s and early 1950s large numbers of people moved with little impediment from East Germany to West Germany. Inevitably some of those making the crossing would turn out to have been sent across to gather information for the East German and Soviet intelligence services. Felfe was employed as an interrogator, tasked with screening, among others, former members of East Germany's quasi-military police service (Volkspolizei) and any identified associates arriving in the refugee camps.

==== West German intelligence ====
Barely two months after his formal recruitment by Soviet Intelligence, Wilhelm Krichbaum recruited Heinz Felfe into the Gehlen Organization in November 1951. That US-sponsored intelligence agency was the precursor to the Federal Intelligence Service (Bundesnachrichtendienst) which would replace it in 1956. The West Germans were evidently not aware in any sufficient detail of the circumstances that had led the British security services to dispense with Felfe's service back in April 1950. Initial contacts between Felfe and the Gehlen Organisation had been choreographed by the very same Hans Clemens who had facilitated Felfe's recruitment by the Soviet Intelligence agency. Felfe's code name in his work for the West German agency was "Friesen". Many years later an angry fellow former West German intelligence officer testified that Reinhard Gehlen himself had used the alternative code name "Fiffi" for Heinz Felfe: the same witness stated that the same alternative name "Fiffi" was also used for the Soviet agent "Paul" by "Alfred", who at the time had been Felfe's KGB handler.

==== Soviet intelligence and West German intelligence ====
Felfe rose quickly through the ranks of the West German intelligence service. After his arrest in November 1961 it would be established that as a double agent his over-riding loyalty was to Soviet intelligence, but along the way the Soviet KGB and GRU (Main Intelligence Directorate / Главное разведывательное управление) were keen to preserve his cover and therefore enabled him to provide plenty of credible intelligence to his West German handlers. Subsequently declassified CIA analysis outlines four elaborate operations undertaken in the early 1950s by Soviet Intelligence, under the codes names "Balthasar", "Lena", "Lilli Marlen" and "Busch", designed to support Felfe's usefulness and credibility in the eyes of his West German bosses. According to Reinhard Gehlen's own memoirs, published in 1971, Felfe had provided an abundance of intelligence nuggets to close confidants of the West German intelligence chief. Within the West German service, Felfe rose rapidly to the relatively senior rank of Regierungsrat. In the end, either by 1955 or 1958, he became the agency's head (or deputy head) of counter-espionage against the Soviets. His status within the service and the confidence of his senior colleagues enabled Felfe's free access to many of the secret files held by the federal government and, notably, its foreign ministry.

He later claimed that he had been heading up a West German spy ring in Moscow from as early as 1953 and that information passed to the West from that exercise had included the secret minutes from meetings of the (East German) ruling party's central committee, featuring alleged criticisms of high-ranking party officials close to the East German leader, Walter Ulbricht: they had also included the identities of ("expendable") KGB agents. Felfe also stated that he had provided the west with a detailed plan of the KGB headquarters in Karlshorst on the south side of Berlin, something which Gehlen loved to show high-ranking intelligence chiefs from his country's western allies.

As head of the department responsible for Soviet counter-intelligence, one of Felfe's longest running projects involved his leadership of "Panoptikum", an operation to uncover a "mole" believed to be operating at a high level within the West German Intelligence Service.

In the end, the target of "Panoptikum" would turn out to be Heinz Felfe.

After his arrest in 1961, the court found that during ten years as an active double agent Felfe had photographed more than 15,000 secret documents and transmitted countless messages by radio, or using one of his personal contacts. He later recalled that he had been able to pass his handlers plans (in the end never implemented) for the creation of a European Defence Community and of the detailed diplomatic planning for the visit to Moscow undertaken in 1955 by the West German Chancellor, Konrad Adenauer. Another career highlight during the 1950s was his success in integrating himself into a CIA operation to penetrate the KGB Headquarters in Berlin, which led to a CIA mole having to disappear in a hurry.

According to two exceptionally well-briefed pundits, Oleg Gordievsky and Christopher Andrew, he managed to keep the Soviets regularly apprised in their major areas of interest concerning the CIA and other intelligence services. From the West German perspective, however, his treachery inflicted serious damage. He betrayed the leadership of the Federal Intelligence Service. Copies of Intelligence Service reports prepared for the Chancellor's office were shared with the Russians. He gave the Soviets the identities of ninety four West Germany overseas "field officers", including the agency chief in Bangkok. The identities of these officers were known to only a very few, even within The Service, but Felfe proved adept at finding their names by sounding out the relevant colleagues.

His senior position in counter-espionage left him plenty of opportunities to cover his own tracks on such matters as any links he may have had with the English spy Kim Philby. Subsequent CIA analysis notes that following his arrest Felfe was open and cooperative on questions to which his interrogators already knew the answers, but in contrast to other more garrulous agents unmasked and quizzed at around the same time, he took care not to disclose matters on which he judged his interrogators were not already well informed. The totality of his damage done must have far exceeded that which has yet come to light: nevertheless, when his apartment was searched more than 300 microfilms containing 15,660 images were found, along with 20 audio tapes.

=== Arrest and trial ===
Felfe was arrested on spying charges on 6 November 1961. The same day the West German intelligence services received a message from their US counterparts, "Congratulations. You found your Felfe: we're still looking for ours" ("Glückwunsch -- Ihr habt Euren Felfe entdeckt, wir unseren noch nicht."). In later years, as the agency turned to the Israelis for help in recreating an espionage network in Eastern Europe, and the extent to which West German intelligence had been penetrated by Soviet agents during the postwar years became clear, the CIA's attitude to West German intelligence would become less congratulatory. Elsewhere in the US intelligence establishment the Counterintelligence Corps (CIC) had always been sceptical over the recruitment of former SS officers into Gehlen's Intelligence service (from 1956 the BND): the CIC were already, in 1953, including Felfe on a list of potential defectors, but the available indications are that the CIC never shared their doubts with the CIA which was in some ways a rival operation. In the end it was a Soviet defector, a KGB major called Anatoliy Golitsyn, who in October 1961 provided the decisive information that led to Felfe. Golitsyn was unable to supply Felfe's name, but he provided sufficient detail to make identification of the Soviet mole easy.

It was later pointed out that both the US and West German intelligence services should have been led to Felfe much sooner, for instance on account of a lifestyle more lavish than could easily be explained by his income as an employee of the West German Intelligence services. Looking back there were those who judged the intelligence that Felfe obtained too good to be true. On the other hand, right up till his unmasking in November 1961 Felfe retained the stubborn backing of the agency's powerful chief, Reinhard Gehlen, who is on record with his appreciation of the quality of Felfe's intelligence. There are also suggestions in retrospective intelligence analyses that the sheer extent to which West German intelligence was penetrated by the Soviets during the 1950s may have meant that there were more senior people in it ready to protect Felfe than will ever become public.

Two other intelligence agents arrested on suspicion of spying for the Soviet Union on 6 November 1961 were an agent called Erwin Tiebel and Hans Clemens, the man who had played such a prominent role in Felfe's recruitment into both the Soviet and the West German Intelligence Services. Clemens and Felfe admitted to having passed 15,000 classified documents to the Soviets. Clemens received a 10-years sentence for treason.

On 22 July 1963 the Federal Court of Justice in Karlsruhe found the three men guilty of spying for the Soviet Union. Their jail terms were set at 3, 11 and 14 years. The 14 year sentence went to Felfe.

=== Release ===
Still aged only 51, Felfe was nevertheless released on 14 February 1969 in exchange for 21 (mostly political) prisoners including three West German students from Heidelberg – Walter Naumann, Peter Sonntag and Volker Schaffhauser – who had been convicted in the Soviet Union for spying because they had allegedly been caught writing down the license plate numbers of Soviet military vehicles on behalf of the CIA.

The exchange took place at Herleshausen, by then one of the few border check points still open along the inner German border that divided East and West Germany. It came about only following massive pressure from the German Democratic Republic which threatened to break off the secret political prisoner ransom scheme that the two Germanys had been quietly operating since 1964. It happened in the face of strong opposition from Gerhard Wessel, who in 1968 had taken over from Gehlen as head of West German Intelligence. The number of political detainees exchanged for him and the extent of the pressure the Soviets were willing to apply through their East German proxies in support of Felfe's release testify to his importance in the eyes of Soviet intelligence.

Following his release Felfe worked briefly for the KGB before returning to East Berlin where, in 1972, he became a Professor for Criminalistics at East Berlin's Humboldt University.

== The memoir ==
Heinz Felfe published his memoir in 1986 under the title In the Service of the enemy: Ten years as Moscow's man in the Federal Intelligence Service. The manuscript had been reviewed by Felfe's former employers in the KGB, and during a press interview he gave the estimate that perhaps 10-15% of what he had written had been removed at their request, while their acceptance of certain other passages had surprised him. At the book launch in East Berlin he stressed his (Federal) German nationality (which after reunification would become the nationality of Germans on both sides of the former inner German border). After 1990 this was reported to have caused some irritation among a nostalgic element who still treasured the memory of the defiantly separate German Democratic Republic.

== Evaluation ==
Public disclosure of Felfe's activities damaged the reputation of the West German Intelligence Service, which just three months earlier had been taken by surprise by the erection of the Berlin Wall. The intelligence services lost the confidence of the political establishment domestically and of the intelligence services of other countries, notably the United States, which now became much more cautious about information sharing. Even more damaging was the destruction of trust within the Bundesnachrichtendienst itself.

According to Heribert Hellenbroich (head of BND) on public TV, Felfe displayed a healthy measure of chutzpah while being an instructor to nascent spies of BND: During his explanation of secret communication via shortwave radio from KGB / Moscow to their European spies, he used actual radio traffic (encrypted number sequences in spoken German language voice) that in fact contained orders that Felfe himself was to carry out on behalf of the Soviets.

In March 2008 Heinz Felfe received congratulations from the Russian FSB (successor to the Soviet KGB) on the occasion of his 90th birthday.

== Bibliography ==
- Felfe, Heinz: Im Dienst des Gegners: 10 Jahre Moskaus Mann im BND. Rasch und Röhring Verlag, Hamburg/Zürich 1986, ISBN 3-89136-059-2 (seine Erinnerungen und Rechtfertigung)
- Reese, Mary Ellen: Organisation Gehlen. Rowohlt 1992 (englisches Original: General Reinhard Gehlen – the CIA connection, Fairfax 1990)
- Piekalkiewicz, Janusz: Weltgeschichte der Spionage. Weltbild 1990, S. 464
- Höhne, Heinz: Der Krieg im Dunkeln. Macht und Einfluss des deutschen und russischen Geheimdienstes. Bertelsmann, München 1985, ISBN 3-570-05667-8, S. 548ff
- "Heinz Felfe", Der Spiegel, 23 June 2008, Nachruf, no. Heft 26, p. 166, archived from the original on 28 October 2010
