= Margaret Taylor (disambiguation) =

Margaret Taylor may refer to:

- Margaret Taylor (1788–1852), wife of Zachary Taylor and First Lady of the United States from 1849 to 1850
- Margaret Young Taylor (1837–1919), American leader in The Church of Jesus Christ of Latter-day Saints
- Margaret L. Curry (born Taylor, 1898–1986), American state parole officer and medical social worker
- Peggy Taylor (1927–2002), American singer and television announcer
- Peg Taylor (cricketer) (1917–2004), New Zealand cricketer
- Peggy Taylor (spy) (1920–2006), French World War II spy
- Peggy Taylor (EastEnders), a character from EastEnders

== See also ==
- Margaret Taylor-Burroughs (1915–2010), American artist and writer
