= Reinhard Gehlen =

German general (1902–1979)

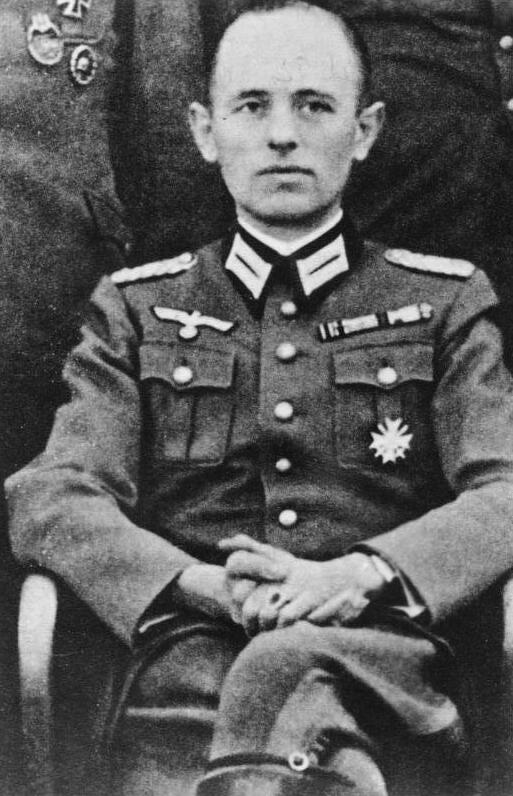
- Born: 3 March 1902; Erfurt, Province of Saxony, Kingdom of Prussia, German Empire
- Died: 8 June 1979 (aged 77); Starnberg, Bavaria, West Germany
- Military career
- Allegiance: Weimar Republic; Nazi Germany; United States; West Germany
- Branch: German Army
- Service years: 1920–1956
- Rank: Generalmajor (Wehrmacht); Generalleutnant der Reserve (Bundeswehr)
- Unit: 213th Infantry Division
- Commands: Foreign Armies East
- Conflicts: World War II; Cold War
- Awards: Deutsches Kreuz in silver War Merit Cross; Großes Bundesverdienstkreuz am Schulterband; Grand Cross of the Order pro Merito Melitensi of the Order of Malta (1948)

Reinhard Gehlen (3 April 1902 – 8 June 1979) was a German military and intelligence officer, later dubbed "Hitler's Super Spy," who served the Weimar Republic, Nazi Germany, and West Germany, and also worked for the United States during the early years of the Cold War. He led the Gehlen Organization, which worked with the CIA from its founding, employing former SS and Wehrmacht officers, and later became the first head of West Germany's Federal Intelligence Service (BND). In years prior, he was in charge of German military intelligence on the Eastern Front during World War II and later became one of the founders of the West German armed forces, the Bundeswehr.

The son of an army officer and World War I veteran, in 1920 Gehlen joined the Reichswehr, the truncated army of the Weimar Republic, and was an operations staff officer in an infantry division during the invasion of Poland in 1939. After that he was appointed to the staff of General Franz Halder, the Chief of the Army High Command (OKH), and quickly became one of his main assistants. Gehlen had a significant role in planning the German operations in Greece, Yugoslavia, and the Soviet Union. When the Red Army continued to fight after the initial German success during Operation Barbarossa, in the spring of 1942 Gehlen was appointed by Halder as director of Foreign Armies East (FHO), the military intelligence service of the OKH tasked with analyzing the Soviet Armed Forces. He achieved the rank of major general before he was dismissed by Adolf Hitler in April 1945 because of the FHO's alleged "defeatism" and accurate but pessimistic intelligence reports about Red Army military superiority.

Following the end of World War II, Gehlen surrendered to the United States Army. While in a POW camp, Gehlen offered FHO's microfilmed and secretly buried archives about the USSR and his own services to the U.S. intelligence community. Following the start of the Cold War, the U.S. military (G-2 Intelligence) accepted Gehlen's offer and assigned him to establish the Gehlen Organization, an espionage service focusing on the Soviet Union and Soviet Bloc. Beginning with his time as head of the Gehlen Organization, Gehlen favored both Atlanticism and close cooperation between what would become West Germany, the U.S. intelligence community, and the other members of the NATO military alliance. The organization employed hundreds of former members of the Nazi Party and former Wehrmacht military intelligence officers.

After West Germany regained its sovereignty, Gehlen became the founding president of the Federal Intelligence Service (Bundesnachrichtendienst, BND) of West Germany (1956–68). Gehlen obeyed a direct order from West German Chancellor Konrad Adenauer, and also hired former counterintelligence officers of the Schutzstaffel (SS) and the Sicherheitsdienst (SD), in response to an alleged avalanche of covert ideological subversion hitting West Germany from the intelligence services behind the Iron Curtain.

Gehlen was instrumental in negotiations to establish an official West German intelligence service based on the Gehlen Organization of the early 1950s. In 1956, the Gehlen Organization was transferred to the West German government and formed the core of the Federal Intelligence Service (BND), the Federal Republic of Germany's official foreign intelligence service, with Gehlen serving as its first president until his retirement in 1968. While this was a civilian office, he was also a lieutenant-general in the Reserve forces of the Bundeswehr, the highest-ranking reserve-officer in the military of West Germany.

== Early life and career ==
Gehlen was born 1902 into a Protestant family in Erfurt and had two brothers and a sister. His father was Walther Gehlen, an officer in the Imperial German Army during World War I, and his mother, Katharina Margaret Gehlen (née van Vaernewycks), was a Flemish noblewoman. He grew up in Breslau, where his father, a former army officer, was a publisher for the Ferdinand-Hirt-Verlag, a publishing house specializing in school books. In his youth, Gehlen's main interests were mathematics and horses.

He wanted to follow his father's path and become an army officer, despite the recent defeat of Germany in World War I and the reduction in the size of the army. In 1920, at the age of eighteen, Gehlen completed his Abitur and joined the Reichswehr. In 1921 he was posted to the 6th Light Artillery Regiment (later the 3rd Prussian Artillery Regiment) in Schweidnitz, a town in Silesia near the Polish border, and 1923 he became a lieutenant. He graduated from the infantry and artillery schools. Gehlen received an assignment at the cavalry school in Hanover in 1926, where he spent two years before requesting a transfer, and in 1928 he was sent to back to his original unit in Schweidnitz. There he met a secretary working for the military, Herta von Seydlitz-Kurzbach, and they married in 1931. She was a member of an aristocratic Prussian military family.

After Adolf Hitler rose to power in 1933 there was an expansion of the Reichswehr, including more opportunities for officers to receive promotions. That same year in October, Gehlen began attending the "Commander Assistants Training," the equivalent of the German staff college during the Weimar Republic, and in June 1935 he graduated as second in his class. The following month he was promoted to captain and assigned to the "Troop Office," or what was renamed the German General Staff in 1936. During his early years on the General Staff, in October 1936 he was assigned to the Operations Section, and in the following year he was reassigned to the Fortifications Section. In November 1938 Gehlen was again posted to an artillery regiment.

== Second World War ==
At the time of the Germany's invasion of Poland in September 1939, Gehlen was a major and an operations staff officer in the 213th Infantry Division. It was mobilized for the Polish campaign but did not see any action, being held in reserve. He was still awarded the Iron Cross, second class. In late 1939 he was transferred to the staff of General Franz Halder, the Chief of the Oberkommando des Heeres (OKH), the Army High Command. In his early work, Gehlen was once again planning the construction of fortifications, both along the Soviet border and in the west. Halder increasingly relied on Gehlen during the spring of 1940 and he became one of Halder's main assistants. Gehlen was sent as his liaison officer to several German units that were involved in the Battle of France in May 1940 (the 16th Army and the Panzer Group), and in October of that year he was assigned to the Eastern Group of the Operations Section, led by Colonel Adolf Heusinger. Heusinger—who incidentally would later work with Gehlen after the war, as the first head of the West German Bundeswehr—also recognized Gehlen's talent as a staff officer.

From late 1940 Gehlen worked on operational planning for Germany's movement east. That included the invasion and occupation of Greece and Yugoslavia, as well as the preparations for Operation Barbarossa. In February 1941 Gehlen was described in a report by his superiors as "a fine example of a general staff officer ... Great operational ability and a great deal of foresight in his thinking." He was also noted to be very hardworking. His role in Barbarossa was mainly planning for the difficulties of bringing reserves up to the front, separating the areas of the army groups and armies in the invasion, and arranging transportation. For this work Gehlen was awarded the War Merit Cross, first and second classes, in the spring of 1941.

As Operation Barbarossa began and the Red Army continued to fight despite its losses, Halder became upset at his intelligence department for not informing him of the true extent of Soviet military capabilities. In late 1941 Gehlen was being considered to replace Colonel Eberhard Kinzel as the head of Foreign Armies East (Fremde Heere Ost, FHO), the Army Staff section responsible for analyzing the Soviet Union, on the recommendation of Colonel Heusinger. Halder was dissatisfied with Kinzel's performance and was looking for a replacement, though he thought that the 40-year old Gehlen was too young for such an important role and had no previous intelligence background. Heusinger believed that Gehlen was a good manager, and on his advice, Gehlen was appointed the head of FHO on 1 April 1942.

=== Head of FHO ===
The anticommunist espionage networks of the Gehlen Organization remained in place after the Red Army's conquest and the consolidation of Soviet hegemony in the east of Europe.

In spring of 1942, Lieutenant Colonel Gehlen assumed command of the Foreign Armies East (FHO) after the dismissal of Colonel Kinzel. Prior to that he had little intelligence experience, though he did have interactions with military intelligence, the Abwehr, during his earlier work at the Army High Command, to the point where he received a warning for meddling too much in the affairs of that agency.

Before the Wehrmacht disasters in the Battle of Stalingrad (23 August 1942 – 2 February 1943), a year into the German war against the Soviet Union, Gehlen understood that the FHO required fundamental re-organization, and secured a staff of army linguists and geographers, anthropologists, lawyers, and junior military officers who would improve the FHO as a military-intelligence organization despite the Nazi ideology of Slavic inferiority.

As leader of the FHO, Gehlen relied heavily on reports from the Klatt Bureau's Max network which provided over 10,000 highly accurate reports on Soviet troop movements.

=== Dismissal, 1945 ===
Gehlen's cadre of FHO intelligence-officers produced accurate field intelligence about the Red Army that frequently contradicted Nazi Party ideological perceptions of the eastern battle front. Hitler dismissed the gathered information as defeatism and philosophically harmful to the war effort against "Judeo-Bolshevism" in Russia. In April 1945, despite the accuracy of the intelligence, Hitler dismissed Gehlen soon after his promotion to major general.

=== Preparation for Post-War ===
The FHO collection of both military and political intelligence from captured Red Army soldiers assured Gehlen's post–WWII survival as a Western anticommunist spymaster, with networks of spies and secret agents in the countries of Soviet-occupied Europe. During the German war against the Soviet Union in 1941 to 1945, Gehlen's FHO collected much tactical military intelligence about the Red Army, and much strategic political intelligence about the Soviet Union. Understanding that the Soviet Union would defeat and occupy the Third Reich, Gehlen ordered the FHO intelligence files copied to microfilm; the FHO files proper were stored in watertight drums and buried in various locations in the Austrian Alps.

They amounted to fifty cases of German intelligence about the Soviet Union, which were at Gehlen's disposal as a bargaining tool with the intelligence services of the Western Allies. Meanwhile, as of 1946, when Joseph Stalin consolidated his absolute power and control over Central, Eastern, and Southeastern Europe as agreed at the Potsdam Conference of 1945 and demarcated with what became known as the Iron Curtain, the Western Allies of World War II, the U.S., Britain, and France had no sources of covert information within the countries in which the occupying Red Army had vanquished the Wehrmacht.

== Cold War ==
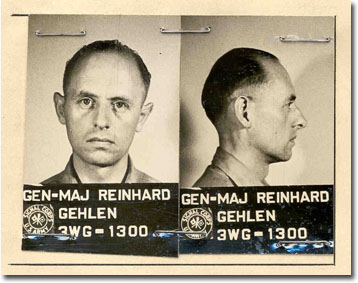
Gehlen in 1945

On 22 May 1945, Gehlen surrendered to the Counter Intelligence Corps (CIC) of the U.S. Army in Bavaria and was taken to Camp King, near Oberursel, and interrogated by Captain John R. Boker. The American Army recognised his potential value as a spymaster with great knowledge of Soviet forces and anticommunist intelligence contacts in the Soviet Union. In exchange for his own liberty and the release of his former subordinates (also prisoners of the US Army), Gehlen offered the Counter Intelligence Corps access to the FHO's intelligence archives and to his intelligence gathering abilities aimed at the Soviet Union, known later as the Gehlen Organization. Boker removed his name and those of his Wehrmacht command from the official lists of German prisoners of war, and transferred seven former FHO senior officers to join Gehlen. The FHO archives were unearthed and secretly taken to Camp King, ostensibly without the knowledge of the camp commander. By the end of summer 1945, Captain Boker had the support of Brigadier General Edwin Sibert, the senior G2 (intelligence) officer of the U.S. Twelfth Army Group, who arranged the secret transport of Gehlen, his officers and the FHO intelligence archives, authorized by his superiors in the chain of command, General Walter Bedell Smith (chief of staff for General Eisenhower), who worked with William Donovan (former OSS chief) and Allen Dulles (OSS chief), who also was the OSS station-chief in Bern. On 20 September 1945, Gehlen and three associates were flown from the American Zone of Occupation in Germany to the US, to become spymasters for the Western Allies.

In July 1946, the US officially released Gehlen and returned him to occupied Germany. On 6 December 1946, he began espionage operations against the Soviet Union, by establishing what was known to US intelligence as the Gehlen Organization or "the Org", a secret intelligence service composed of former intelligence officers of the Wehrmacht and members of the SS and the SD, which was headquartered first at Oberursel, near Frankfurt, then at Pullach, near Munich. The organization's cover-name was the South German Industrial Development Organization. Gehlen initially selected 350 ex-Wehrmacht military intelligence officers as his staff; eventually, the organization recruited some 4,000 anticommunist secret agents.

=== Gehlen Organization, 1947–1956 ===
After he started working for the U.S. Government, Gehlen was subordinate to US Army G-2 (Intelligence). He resented this arrangement and in 1947, the year after his Organization was established, Gehlen arranged for a transfer to the Central Intelligence Agency (CIA). The agency kept close control of the Gehlen Organization, because during the early years of the Cold War of 1945–91, Gehlen's agents were providing the United States Federal Government with more than 70% of its intelligence on the Soviet armed forces.

Early in 1948, Gehlen Org Spymasters began receiving detailed reports from their sources throughout the Soviet Zone of covert East German remilitarization long before any West German politicians had even thought of such a thing. Further operations by the Gehlen Org produced detailed reports about Soviet construction and testing of the MiG-15 jet-propelled aircraft, which United States airmen flying F-86 fighters would soon to face in aerial combat during the Korean War.

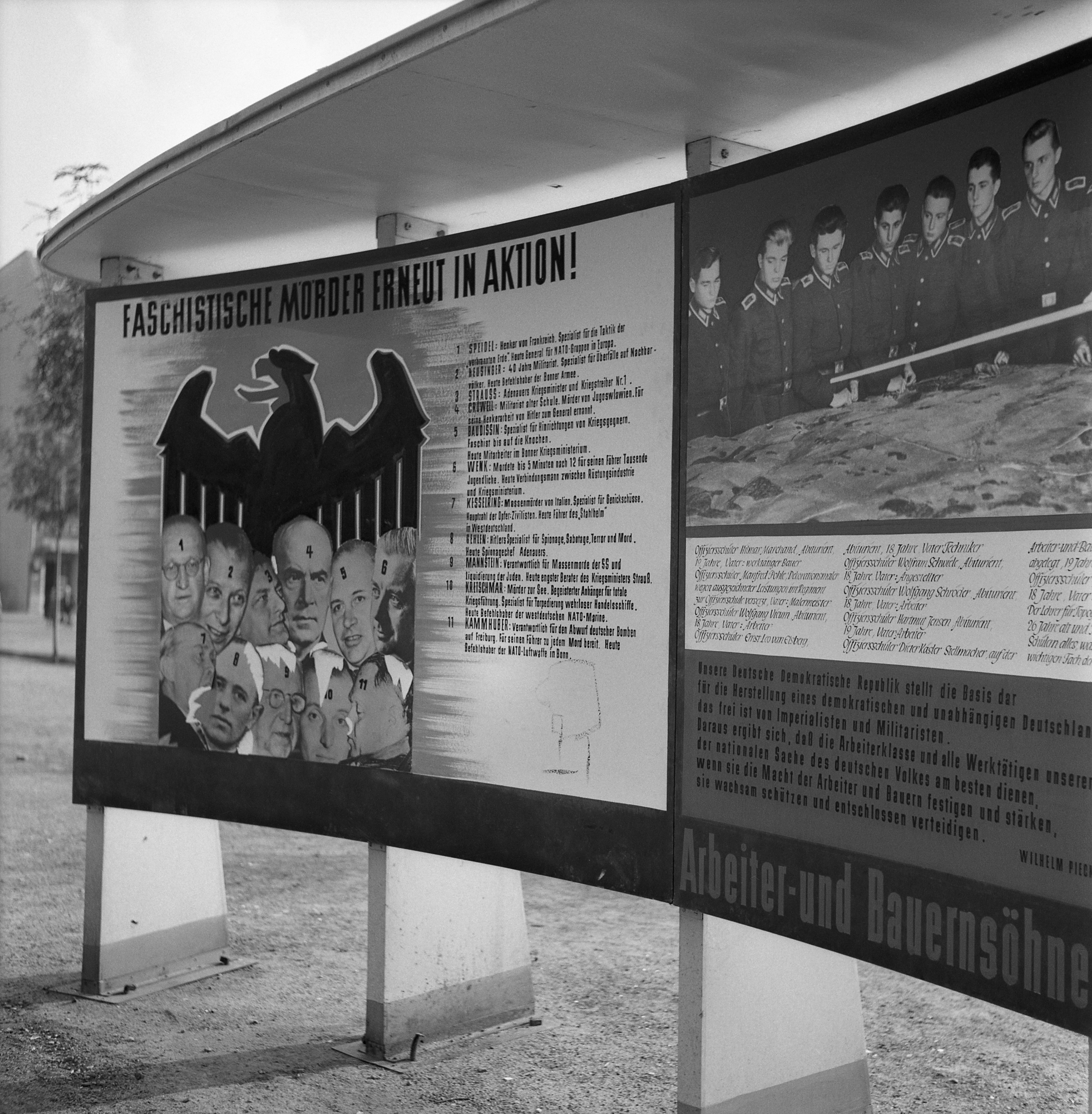
East German propaganda in 1957

Between 1947 and 1955, the Gehlen Organization also debriefed every German PoW who returned to West Germany from captivity in the Soviet GULAG. The network employed hundreds of former Wehrmacht military intelligence and some SS officers, and also recruited many other agents from within the massive anti-Communist ethnic German, Soviet, and East European refugee communities throughout Western Europe. They were accordingly able to develop detailed maps of the railroad systems, airfields, and ports of the USSR, and the Org's field agents even infiltrated the Baltic Soviet Republics and the Ukrainian SSR.

Among the Org's earliest counterespionage successes was Operation Bohemia, which began in March 1948 after Božena Hájková, the sister in law of Czechoslovak military intelligence officer Captain Vojtěch Jeřábek, defected to the American Zone and applied for political asylum in the United States. After learning from Hájková that Captain Jeřábek was secretly expressing anti-communist opinions to his family, the Org dispatched a Czech refugee and veteran field agent codenamed "Ondřej" to make contact with the Captain and his family in Prague. During the night of 8–9 November 1948, after being warned by "Ondřej" of an imminent Stalinist witch hunt for "rootless cosmopolitans" within the Czechoslovak officer corps, Captain Jeřábek and two other senior military intelligence officers crossed the border into the American Zone and defected to the West. In addition to several lists of Czechoslovak spies in West Germany, Captain Jeřábek also carried the keys to breaking Czechoslovak intelligence's codes. The results were nothing less than devastating for Czechoslovak espionage and led to multiple arrests and convictions.

The existence of the Gehlen Organization and its relationship with the CIA became public knowledge when British newspaper The Daily Express and its foreign correspondent Sefton Delmer published a story on Gehlen in March 1952. Though the source for the story, headlined, 'Hitler’s general now spies for dollars', has never been fully verified, British intelligence suspected that Otto John, the head of the Bundesamt für Verfassungsschutz (BfV) at the time, had leaked information to Delmer. John had worked with Delmer as part of Britain's black propaganda efforts during the Second World War.

The security and efficacy of the Gehlen Organization were compromised by East German and Soviet moles within it, such as Johannes Clemens, Erwin Tiebel and Heinz Felfe who were feeding information while in the Org and later, while in the BND that was headed by Gehlen. All three were eventually discovered and convicted in 1963.

There were also Communists and their sympathizers within the CIA and the SIS (MI6), especially Kim Philby and the other members of the Cambridge Five. As such information appeared, Gehlen, personally, and the Gehlen Organization, officially, were attacked by the governments of the Western powers. The British government was especially hostile towards Gehlen, and the politically Left wing British press ensured full publicisation of the existence of the Gehlen Organization, which further compromised the operation.

=== Federal Intelligence Service (BND), 1956–1968 ===
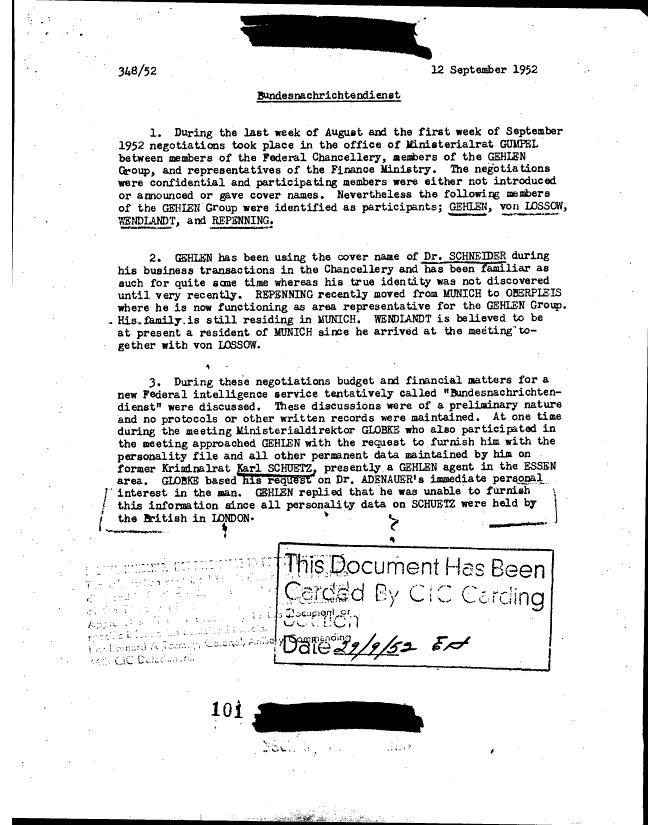
The Gehlen Organization in transition: CIA report on the negotiations to establish the BND (1952) of West Germany.

On 1 April 1956, 11 years after World War II had ended, the U.S. Government and the CIA formally transferred the Gehlen Organization to the authority of what was by then the Federal Republic of Germany, under Chancellor Konrad Adenauer (1949–63). By way of that transfer of geopolitical sponsorship, the anti–Communist Gehlen Organization became the nucleus of the Bundesnachrichtendienst (BND, Federal Intelligence Service).

Gehlen was the president of the BND as an espionage service until his retirement in 1968. The end of Gehlen's career as a spymaster resulted from a confluence of events in West Germany: the exposure of a KGB mole, Heinz Felfe, (a former SS lieutenant) working at BND headquarters; political estrangement from Adenauer, in 1963, which aggravated his professional problems; and the inefficiency of the BND consequent to Gehlen's poor leadership and continual inattention to the business of counter-espionage as national defence.

According to Der Spiegel journalists Heinz Höhne and Hermann Zolling, the premature end of the German colonial empire in 1918 placed West Germany's new foreign intelligence service, the Bundesnachrichtendienst at a considerable advantage in dealing with the newly independent governments of post-colonial Africa, Asia, and the Middle East. This is why many Third World military and foreign intelligence services were largely trained by BND military advisors. This made it possible for the BND to easily receive accurate intelligence in these regions which the CIA and former colonialist intelligence services could not acquire without recruiting local spy rings. BND covert activities in the Third World also laid the groundwork for friendly relations that Gehlen attempted to use to steer local governments into taking an anti-Soviet and pro-NATO stance during the ongoing Cold War and further assisted the West German economic miracle by both encouraging and favoring West German trade and corporate investment.

Gehlen's refusal to correct reports with questionable content strained the organization's credibility, and dazzling achievements became an infrequent commodity. A veteran agent remarked at the time that the BND pond then contained some sardines, though a few years earlier the pond had been alive with sharks.

The fact that the BND could score certain successes despite East German Stasi interference, internal malpractice, inefficiencies and infighting, was primarily due to select members of the staff who took it upon themselves to step up and overcome then existing maladies. Abdication of responsibility by Reinhard Gehlen was the malignancy; bureaucracy and cronyism remained pervasive, even nepotism (at one time Gehlen had 16 members of his extended family on the BND payroll). Only slowly did the younger generation then advance to substitute new ideas for some of the bad habits caused mainly by Gehlen's semi-retired attitude and frequent holiday absences.

Gehlen was forced out of the BND due to "political scandal within the ranks", according to one source, He retired in 1968 as a civil servant of West Germany, classified as a Ministerialdirektor, a senior grade with a generous pension. His successor, Bundeswehr Brigadier General Gerhard Wessel, immediately called for a program of modernization and streamlining.

== Honors ==
- Iron Cross second class
- War Merit Cross second and first class with swords
- German Cross in silver (1945)
- Grand Cross of the Order pro Merito Melitensi of the Sovereign Military Order of Malta (1948)
- Grand Cross of the Order of Merit of the Federal Republic of Germany (1968)
- Good Conduct Medal

== Criticism ==
Several publications have criticized that Gehlen allowed former Nazis to work for the agencies. The authors of the book A Nazi Past: Recasting German Identity in Postwar Europe (2015) stated that Reinhard Gehlen simply did not want to know the backgrounds of the men whom the BND hired in the 1950s. The American National Security Archive states that "he employed numerous former Nazis and known war criminals".

An article in The Independent on 29 June 2018 made this statement about BND employees:

"Operating until 1956, when it was superseded by the BND, the Gehlen Organization was allowed to employ at least 100 former Gestapo or SS officers.... Among them were Adolf Eichmann's deputy Alois Brunner, who would go on to die of old age despite having sent more than 100,000 Jews to ghettos or internment camps, and ex-SS major Emil Augsburg.... Many ex-Nazi functionaries including Silberbauer, the captor of Anne Frank, transferred over from the Gehlen Organization to the BND.... Instead of expelling them, the BND even seems to have been willing to recruit more of them – at least for a few years".

Gehlen was cleared by the CIA's James H. Critchfield, who worked with the Gehlen Organization from 1949 to 1956. In 2001, he said that "almost everything negative that has been written about Gehlen, [as an] ardent ex-Nazi, one of Hitler's war criminals ... is all far from the fact," as quoted in the Washington Post. Critchfield added that Gehlen hired the former Sicherheitsdienst (Security Service of the Reichsführer-SS) men "reluctantly, under pressure from German Chancellor Konrad Adenauer to deal with 'the avalanche of subversion hitting them from East Germany'".

== Legacy ==
Gehlen's memoirs were published in 1977 by World Publishers, New York. In the same year another book was published about him, The General Was a Spy, by Heinz Hoehne and Herman Zolling, Coward, McCann and Geoghegan, New York. A review of the latter, published by the CIA in 1996, calls it a "poor book" and goes on to allege that "so much of it is sheer garbage" because of many errors. The CIA review also discusses another book, Gehlen, Spy of the Century, by E. H. Cookridge, Hodder and Stoughton, London, 1971, and claims that it is "chock full of errors". The CIA review is kinder when speaking of Gehlen's memoirs but makes this comment:

"Gehlen's descriptions of most of his so-called successes in the political intelligence field are, in my opinion, either wishful thinking or self-delusion.... Gehlen was never a good clandestine operator, nor was he a particularly good administrator. And therein lay his failures. The Gehlen Organization/BND always had a good record in the collection of military and economic intelligence on East Germany and the Soviet forces there. But this information, for the most part, came from observation and not from clandestine penetration".

Upon Gehlen's retirement in 1968, a CIA note on Gehlen describes him as "essentially a military officer in habits and attitudes". He was also characterized as "essentially a conservative", who refrained from entertaining and drinking, was fluent in English, and was at ease among senior American officials.

== In popular culture ==
In the 2023 political thriller TV series Bonn (German: Bonn – Alte Freunde, neue Feinde), set in Germany in 1954 and aired in Das Erste, Gehlen is played by Martin Wuttke.

== Bibliography and sources ==
- Breitman, Richard; Goda, Norman J. W.; Naftali, Timothy; Wolfe, Robert (2005). U.S. Intelligence and the Nazis. Cambridge University Press. ISBN 0-521-85268-4.
- Cookridge, E. H. (1971). Gehlen: Spy of the Century. London: Hodder & Stoughton; New York: Random House (1972).
- Critchfield, James H. (2003). Partners at Creation: The Men Behind Postwar Germany's Defense and Intelligence Establishments. Annapolis: Naval Institute Press. ISBN 1591141362.
- Hastings, Max (2015). The Secret War: Spies, Codes and Guerrillas 1939–1945 (Paperback). London: William Collins. ISBN 978-0-00-750374-2.
- Hersh, Burton (1992). The Old Boys: The American Elite and the Origins of the CIA. New York: Scribner's.
- Höhne, Heinz; Zolling, Hermann (1972). The General Was a Spy: The Truth about General Gehlen and His Spy Ring. Translated by Barry, Richard. New York: Coward, McCann & Geoghegan. ISBN 0-698-10430-7.
- Kross, Peter. "Intelligence" in Military Heritage, October 2004, pp. 26–30
- Oglesby, Carl (Fall 1990). "The Secret Treaty of Fort Hunt." CovertAction Information Bulletin.
- Reese, Mary Ellen. General Reinhard Gehlen: The CIA Connection. Fairfax, Vir.: George Mason University. 1990
- United States National Archives, Washington, D.C. NARA Collection of Foreign Records Seized, Microfilm T-77, T-78
- Weiner, Tim (2008). Legacy of Ashes: The History of the CIA. Anchor Books, pp. 10–190. ISBN 978-0307389008.
- Petty, Terence (2023). Nazis at the Watercooler : War criminals in Postwar German Government Agencies. Potomac Books ISBN 9781640126398
- Whiting, Charles (1972). Gehlen: Germany's Master Spy. New York: Ballantine Books. ISBN 0-345-25884-3.

== Literature ==
- John Douglas-Gray in his thriller The Novak Legacy ISBN 978-0-7552-1321-4
- W. E. B. Griffin, in his post-World War II novel Top Secret ISBN 978-0-399-17123-9
- Charles Whiting, Germany's Master Spy ISBN 0-345-25884-3 (1972)

Government offices
Preceded by None	President of the Federal Intelligence Bureau; 1956–1968	Succeeded by Gerhard Wessel
