= Heinz Höhne =

German journalist and historian (1926–2010)

- Born: 1926; Berlin, Germany
- Died: 27 March 2010 (aged 83–84)
- Occupations: Journalist; author; historian

Heinz Höhne (1926 – 27 March 2010) was a German journalist and author, who specialized in Third Reich military and West German Cold War foreign intelligence history.

== Biography ==
Born in Berlin in 1926, Höhne was educated there until he was called to fight during the last months of the Second World War. He served in the Panzerkorps Großdeutschland. After the war, he studied journalism in Munich and went on to work for various newspapers as a freelance reporter. In 1955, he was hired by the weekly magazine Der Spiegel, where he joined the foreign staff of the magazine and eventually took charge of the Anglo-American department.

Through his research in the archives he produced a document that – relayed by Conrad Ahlers, the chief protagonist of the Spiegel affair – helped improve the former deputy head of the Reich Ministry of Public Enlightenment and Propaganda Kurt Kiesinger's reputation enough to pave his way to West German chancellorship in 1966.

== Works ==
Höhne's efforts covered Nazi history. His best-known work is entitled The Order of the Death's Head: The Story of Hitler's SS. (Der Orden unter dem Totenkopf: Die Geschichte der SS). This work first appeared in 1967, and other works subsequently followed, such as his 1971 study of the Soviet Union's spy network entitled Codeword: Direktor.

In 1976, Höhne went on to write Canaris, an interpretation of Hitler's spymaster, who was in charge of the Abwehr.

Another work from Höhne is Krieg im Dunkeln (1985), which examines the centuries-old relationship between Russian and German intelligence. After his retirement, Höhne worked on a history of the Third Reich, the first volume of which, Gebt mir vier Jahre Zeit, appeared in 1996.

== Reception ==
Höhne's 1967 book on the SS has been translated into many languages, including English, French, Italian, Spanish, Russian, Polish, Greek, Japanese and Chinese.

There are a number of references to Höhne's work on the SS by other historians who have written on Nazi Germany. The former Intelligence Corps officer Adrian Weale's 2012 work, Army of Evil: A History of the SS, frequently cites Höhne's The Order of the Death's Head: The Story of Hitler's SS, although challenging some of the assertions found therein.

Höhne's 1972 book, The General Was a Spy: The Truth about General Gehlen and his Spy Ring, received a less than glowing classified review from an anonymous CIA analyst, who excoriated it for factual inaccuracy and tendentiousness, writing that "so much of it is sheer garbage". The reviewer pointed out that Gehlen had been suspected by Chancellor Konrad Adenauer in 1962 of having tipped off the Spiegel editors about a planned government raid in search of leaked documents, so that they could be destroyed in advance.

== Bibliography ==
- The Order of the Death's Head: The Story of Hitler's SS. (Der Orden unter dem Totenkopf: Die Geschichte der SS) First published in 1967. ISBN 0-14-139012-3
- SS a Ordem Negra (1970)
- Codeword: Direktor. (1971)
- with Zolling, Hermann (1972). The General Was a Spy: The Truth about General Gehlen and his spy ring. New York: Coward, McCann & Geoghegan. ISBN 0698104307. (American edition of Pullach Intern, 1971, which was originally a series of articles for Der Spiegel, according to the book's front pages)
- Canaris (1976)
- Krieg im Dunkeln (1985)
- Gebt mir vier Jahre Zeit (1996)
