= Erwin Tiebel =

German jurist and lawyer

- Born: 10 November 1903; Dresden, German Empire
- Died: 17 August 1981 (aged 77); Menden, West Germany
- Occupations: lawyer spy/courier and/or intelligence agent
- Spouse: Isolde Hordler
- Children: Wolfgang; Heidemarie
- Parent(s): Paul Tiebel (? - 1948); Luise Beizmann

Erwin Tiebel (10 November 1903 - 17 August 1981) was a German lawyer. After the Nazis took power he joined the Leipzig chapter of the party in April 1933. During the late 1930s he began working for the security services. His involvement became progressively more time consuming and after 1943 he restricted his law work to existing cases. That year he was recruited into "Amt VI" (literally "Office 6"), the department in Berlin that dealt with political foreign intelligence. He worked on "commercial matters", especially with regard to "currency transactions in foreign countries". Switzerland was a particular focus, though plans that he should himself be posted to Switzerland came to nothing.

After 1945, with housing in desperately short supply, he eventually found lodgings with a young couple called Pohl at Lendringsen in the Sauerland region, east of Dortmund. Pohl was a construction contractor. The Pohls had recently inherited a building business which they were expanding in order to participate in the necessary construction boom that followed the destruction of war. Tiebel worked for a couple of years on the construction sites and thereafter remained with Pohl as a senior member of the growing business, working in a commercial and management capacity.

Tiebel was one of three men arrested on spying charges on 6 November 1961. The other two were Heinz Felfe and Tiebel's old friend, Hans Clemens. They were all found guilty and sentenced on 22 July 1963. The court determined that Erwin Tiebel had worked as a courier and he received a three-year jail sentence. Felfe and Clemens were sentenced respectively to fourteen and eleven years, though none of the three men would serve out their full jail terms.

== Life ==
=== Provenance and early years ===
Erwin Tiebel was born in Dresden. It is known that he had an elder brother, Martin, born in 1901, and a younger brother, Siegfried, born in 1917. The boys' father, Paul Tiebel, who died in 1948, is described as a "master mechanic". Erwin Tiebel attended school in Radeberg (Dresden) from 1910, passing his Abitur (school leaving exams) in 1923. He studied Law at Leipzig and Berlin between 1923 and 1928, passing his first level law exams in 1927 and the second level exams in 1934. Between 1928 and 1934 study was combined with work in the courts at Dresden, Bautzen and Leipzig. In 1934 he joined an existing law practice as a qualified lawyer in Saxony, but almost immediately changed tactics, setting up in private practice as a self-employed lawyer in Radeberg.

=== Hans Clemens and the security services ===
Tiebel was introduced to Johannes "Hans" Clemens by a local bank manager in Autumn 1938. The bank manager had recruited Tiebel the previous year as an informant for the local branch of the security services, required to report on matters such as the state of mind of the people and their attitude towards the government authorities. He was now told that his reports should go directly to Clemens. Clemens was working for the "Sicherheitsdienst" (security services) as head of the "field office" in Dresden. The Sicherheitsdienst operated as a branch of the Nazi paramilitary Schutzstaffel ("SS") organisation. This meant that involvement with the security services implicitly meant involvement with the SS, and in 1940 Tiebel became what he described at a subsequent interrogation an "automatic applicant" for SS membership. Clemens instructed him to keep an eye open for people in the business community who might be recruited to work for the service. Tiebel gave Clemens a number of names over the next few years and subsequently found that Clemens had contacted the individuals involved. Clemens became not just his point of contact with the intelligence services, but also a friend. Activities carried out on behalf of the security services at this stage were not so onerous, however, as to impede Tiebel's regular work in his law office.

In 1941/42 he was placed on the SS payroll in respect of his security services work and given a job at the Dresden command post: the work involved "scanning reports from about 28 so-called field offices", identifying points of significance in respect of commerce, agriculture, administration, transport and law. He then provided summary reports for Berlin. He received a "monthly stipend" of 250 marks for this work and at this stage was still able to undertake his own work as a lawyer. However, in 1943 he was moved to Berlin, recruited into "Amt VI" (literally "Office 6"), the department that dealt with political foreign intelligence. He was told that his supervisor intended for him to be transferred to Switzerland, to work in an "intelligence capacity", but the transfer never took place, and he was based in Berlin till the war ended, in May 1945. It was probably in 1943 that Erwin Tiebel was introduced to Heinz Felfe, though since the two both came from Dresden it is entirely possible that the two of them had come across one another informally at an earlier date.

=== Aftermath of war ===
As the Red Army approached from the east, preceded by powerful reports and/or rumours of atrocities against civilians, a key objective for many Germans who were (or had been) members of the Nazi political or security establishment was to get away, even if this meant moving towards the invading armies from the west. By the time war ended Tiebel had made his way to Garmisch-Partenkirchen where he remained till August 1945, when the postwar division of Germany into previously agreed occupation zones was becoming established on the ground. In August he set off from Garmisch (in the US occupation zone) to Lendringsen (in the British occupation zone) where he registered on 22 September 1945, and where he had the name of a contact (the uncle of the son of someone he had met). At Lendringsen he lived, initially, in a "hotel" which is where he got to know and then befriended Mr. and Mrs. Pohl. Pohl was already working as an independent building contractor, and through him Tiebel was able to obtain work as a building worker. Pohl's activities developed into a building business, and after a couple of years Tiebel took over as Pohl's office manager. He was still in charge of the "office" side of the business in 1961, by which time the business had grown to a substantial size. Already, in 1956, Tiebel had what seems to have amounted to unlimited use of the company's Volkswagen Beetle/Bug.

=== Return of Hans Clemens ===
His friend and former security services boss Hans Clemens had been posted to Rome in connection with intelligence work a year or so before the end of the war, and then captured and held in Italy by the US army as a prisoner of war. In Rome, it was reported he had witnessed the trial of 335 Italian hostages under the direction of the German police chief Herbert Kappler, and later participated in the ensuing "execution". Subsequently acquitted in respect of his alleged involvement he had nevertheless been brutally treated as a prisoner of war. Released in 1947 or 1949 (sources differ), he made his way back to Germany, ending up in Lendringsen where Tiebel was still renting a room with the Pohls. There was space for Clemens to move in as Tiebel's "sub-tenant": he stayed in Tiebel's room at the house for a number of months while he recovered from the physical and mental traumas he had suffered. After Clemens moved out the two friends remained in close touch, and letters for Clemens continued to be delivered to the Pohls' house. Clemens was under pressure from his wife, still in the Soviet zone, to return home to the Dresden area, but there was a concern that his wife's letters were being dictated by the authorities and that if he did return he would face Soviet justice in respect of crimes alleged from the Nazi period. In approximately 1950 Mrs Clemens visited her husband and they stayed together in an hotel in Wuppertal. The encounter was somewhat frosty since, in the euphemistic terms employed by one embarrassed commentator, Gerda Clemens' "futile attempts to keep herself away from the charms of the Russian officers had not remained undisclosed to her husband". Tiebel also saw a good deal of Gerda Glemens during her visit and formed the impression that she might have been sent in order to persuade her husband, who already had a background in German intelligence, to "work for the Russians and come to Dresden". Tiebel subsequently stated to interrogators that he discussed this possibility with his friend and urged him not to go to Dresden. After much agonizing Clemens nevertheless went to Dresden. He returned to Lendringsen a few days later and reported at least some of what had happened. There had been no sudden recruitment, but when he had walked across the border into East Germany (as the Soviet zone had been redesignated in October 1949) to meet his wife, they had then walked together to a car which contained two men and drove them to Dresden. The two men "might have been Russians". It is reasonably clear that over the next few months Hans Clemens did indeed agree to work for Soviet intelligence.

The visits Clemens made to Tiebel in Lendringsen between 1952 and 1956 became relatively infrequent, and letters for Clemens stopped being delivered. Tiebel assumed that Clemens had settled in the Düsseldorf area and was building himself a new life. But the two kept in touch, and at some stage, according to Tiebel's later recollection, Clemens let him know that he (Clemens) was working for the Bonn based Gehlen Organization. Established in 1946 under the U.S. military authorities, the Gehlen organisation had become West Germany's intelligence service. It was directed, sometimes in a strangely idiosyncratic manner, by Reinhard Gehlen who had occupied a senior role in German military intelligence on the Eastern Front between 1941 and 1945 and whose contacts—notably in the Eastern Bloc—were valued by West Germany's allies. Clemens relocated to Stuttgart and he seemed to travel a good deal as part of his work but by mutual consent, when the two friends did meet up, they avoided discussion of his work for the Gehlen organisation (which was replaced/relaunched in 1956 by the West German Federal Intelligence Service) except in the most general terms.

=== Recruitment of a courier ===
By 1956 Clemens had relocated again, "in connection with his work", and during summer he turned up in Lendringsen and told Tiebel that he "intended to get something going with the Russians". Clemens also mentioned that Heinz (Heinz Felfe) (whom Tiebel had known, albeit not so well since 1943 or earlier) was also involved. Clemens also asked Tiebel to undertake "courier" work for him. Clemens knew that Tiebel's work in the construction business meant he had little time, and was content that Tiebel's "missions" should be infrequent, and timed to minimise disruption to his work schedules. Tiebel later explained that he had inferred that his friend "intended to set up a double play against the Russian[s] on behalf of the Gehlen office".

Felfe, Clemens and Tiebel were all originally from the Dresden area: the recruitment of Felfe and Clemens was directed by the KGB office in Dresden, and it is likely that the Dresden office was also involved in subsequently involving Tiebel. Later CIA reports noted that during the years directly following the war the Soviets had systematically targeted former agents of the Nazi Intelligence services, and that they had particular success in recruiting people from Dresden because of bitterness against the British and Americans resulting from the very high level of civilian deaths and suffering caused by the destructive fire bombing of that city in February 1945. The intense bombing of Dresden had been controversial even in London and Washington. Nevertheless, at his interrogations in 1961 Tiebel insisted that when, after due reflection, he "finally" indicated his willingness to help his friend as requested, he did what he did "out of comradeship". At that stage there was little further discussion of the matter. "Detailed briefing" followed a few months later in connection with what Tiebel described as his "first courier trip".

For the first trip to Berlin, the end of 1956, Tiebel travelled by train. There was already a coating of winter snow on the fields. He arranged to meet his elder brother, Martin Tiebel (who still lived in the east, near Dresden) for a discussion of family matters, while taking care to ensure that Martin knew simply that he was "on a business trip". The trip involved a small suitcase with a false bottom which was given to him by Clemens, and crossing into East Berlin using the underground railway (in ways that later became impossible). At the East Berlin underground station he was met by a driver ("Alfred") who took the suitcase and drove him to his destination. After passing through a barrier guarded by a soldier wearing a Russian uniform he was taken to a small villa apparently in a restricted "Soviet zone" inside East Berlin. There was a meeting with two men "who might have been Russian" one of whom spoke excellent German and the other of whom spoke little and with a heavy foreign accent. While he was entertained to a light meal and superficial slightly stilted discussion of the political situation in "the west", the suitcase was returned to him for transmission onward to Clemens, who popped round a couple of days after he got home in order to collect it. There were approximately five-seven more of these "courier" trips by the time of the last one, which took place in September 1960. At Tiebel's suggestion, subsequent trips were undertaken not on the train but using his company Volkswagen. The "handover" now took place, generally, not in Berlin but at a little used motorway parking area along the motorway corridor through East Germany, between West Germany and West Berlin. The parking area was identifiable as the one next to the 107 kilometer marker post along the road. The people he was meeting also arrived, usually, in a Volkswagen, and drove behind him at a distance after he had completed the lengthy frontier formalities and crossed through into East Germany at Helmstedt. Conversation sometimes turned to Hans Clemens whom his interlocutors tended to identify not by a designated code name but simply as "the fat man". Gerda Clemens, his wife, and his daughter Bruni were still in the east, living near Dresden, so news that they were well, or that the daughter had been ill again, was always to be passed on. Tiebel would spend the evening and night in West Berlin and drive home the next day, stopping as before at the parking area next to the 107 kilometer marker post in order to pick up the little suitcase. Provided there was no one around to observe them (in which case the men would busy themselves apparently making repairs to the engine of their car) the exchange took about as long as it took to smoke a cigarette.

=== Arrest ===
Heinz Felfe, Hans Clemens and Erwin Tiebel were all arrested in West Germany on 6 November 1961.

Two years later their trial took place at the Federal Court of Justice in Karlsruhe from 8–19 July 1963, before a panel of five judges chaired by Kurt Weber. It was determined that the trio had transferred 300 rolls of micro-film containing pictures of 15,000 secret documents created by Felfe and Clemens in the course of their work for the Federal Intelligence Service as well as reels of recording tape and information conveyed by radio message. Tiebel's contribution, as far as the court concluded, was restricted to his courier work. It became very clear that Felfe was intellectually dominant and took the leading role, although he was fifteen years younger than Clemens and Tiebel. Nevertheless as Tiebel at one stage made a point of telling the court, when they had first got to know each other back in Dresden it was Tiebel, the older man, who had suggested that they should address one another using the familiar "du" appellation rather than the more formal "Sie". It was further determined that Felfe had been mandated by his Soviet handlers to recruit former comrades from his time with the Nazi security services, though the West German Intelligence Services vehemently denied the suggestion that they employed significant numbers of former Nazi intelligence agents. Commentators were not convinced.

Erwin Tiebel was sentenced for treason on 22 July 1963 to a three-year prison term. He was released in 1964 when he was exchanged to the DDR.

== Personal ==
Erwin Tiebel married his wife Isolde Hordler in October 1941. Isolde was also from a Dresden family, and until Erwin Tiebels's transfer in Berlin in 1943 they lived together in Radeberg near Dresden. The marriage produced two children, Wolfgang and Heidemarie, who were aged 19 and 17 at the end of 1961, so were presumably both born between 1942 and 1945. After 1945 the couple were separated. Erwin Tiebel could not return to the part of Germany that was now administered as the Soviet occupation zone for "political reasons", presumably based on his membership of the security establishment during the Nazi years: Isolde Tiebel, whose mother had recently died, could not leave her father alone in Dresden after he returned from his time as a prisoner of war.

Living in the west after 1945, Tiebel received reports from his mother, who remained in the Dresden area till 1958, that his wife and her father were having trouble coping, and that they had "taken to drink". He later reported, under questioning, that Isolde unsuccessfully tried to persuade him to "take her to the west", while she made no response to his suggestion that they might consider a divorce. Late in 1951 he proposed a family meeting, subsequently travelling to West Berlin (as the non-Soviet sectors of the city were now collectively known) where he met up with his wife, her father and their children, as well as his own (widowed since 1948) mother. The family meeting in 1951/52 lasted two days, and was the last time Tiebel met his wife for at least ten years (and probably for ever). At the end of the meeting Erwin Tiebel took his son Wolfgang back with him to West Germany while his wife, his daughter Heidemarie, his father-in-law Waldemar Hordler and (at this stage) his mother all made their way back home to Radeberg near Dresden.
