= Gerhard Wessel =

President of the Federal Intelligence Service

Gerhard Wessel (December 24, 1913 – July 28, 2002) was President of the Federal Intelligence Bureau from May 1968 to December 1978. He previously served in the Reichswehr (1932–35) and Army, including the Foreign Armies East of Reinhard Gehlen during World War II. After the war, he was part of the Gehlen Organisation, and then the Bundeswehr (1956–1952).

He was head of the BND, Germany's Federal Intelligence Service from 1 May 1968 to 31 December 1978. According to his obituary in the Los Angeles Times, entitled Gerhard Wessel, 88; Did Espionage Work for Hitler, West Germany, the "former intelligence officer in Adolf Hitler’s anti-Soviet spy operations" ... "is credited with modernizing the BND by hiring academic analysts and electronics specialists".

The obituary issued by the New York Times News Service summarized some of the BND's successes under Wessel: "It informed the government three months in advance of the Soviet Union's plans to invade Czechoslovakia in 1968. It also gathered early information about dissatisfaction among shipyard workers in Gdansk, which eventually led to upheaval in Poland in the 1980s". The coverage also discusses the adverse incidents under his leadership. For example, it mentions a "number of incidents of East Germans infiltrating the West German government, particularly intelligence agencies, on Gen. Wessel's watch".

Wessel was born in the Holstein city of Neumuenster; his father was an Evangelical pastor. Gerhard Wessel joined the army in 1932. He died in Pullach.

== Literature ==
(All books in German)

- Albrecht Charisius, ((Julius Mader)): Nicht länger geheim. Entwicklung, System und Arbeitsweise des imperialistischen deutschen Geheimdienstes. Deutscher Militärverlag, Berlin 1969 (4., überarbeitete und ergänzte Auflage. Militärverlag der Deutschen Demokratischen Republik, Berlin 1980).
- James H. Critchfield: Auftrag Pullach. Die Organisation Gehlen 1948–1956. Mittler, Berlin u. a. 2005, ISBN 3-8132-0848-6.
- Helmut Roewer, Stefan Schäfer, Matthias Uhl: Lexikon der Geheimdienste im 20. Jahrhundert. Herbig, München 2003, ISBN 3-7766-2317-9.

Government offices
Preceded by Reinhard Gehlen	President of the Federal Intelligence Bureau; 1968–1978	Succeeded by Klaus Kinkel
