= Klaus Kinkel =

Chairman of the FDP

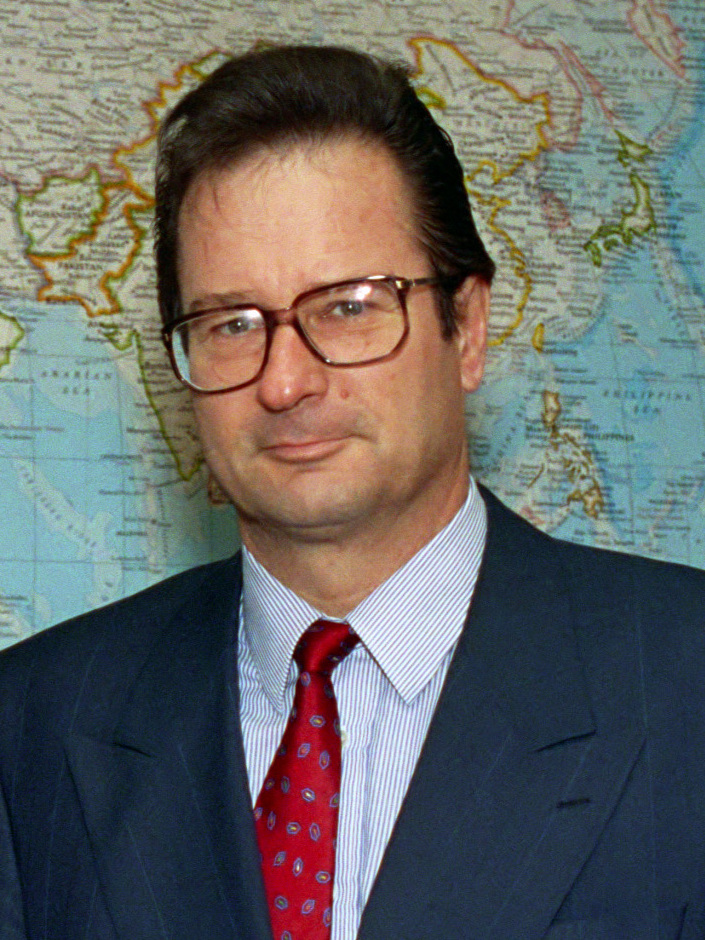
- Kinkel in 1993

Vice Chancellor of Germany
- In office 21 January 1993 – 26 October 1998
- Chancellor: Helmut Kohl
- Preceded by: Jürgen Möllemann
- Succeeded by: Joschka Fischer

Leader of the Free Democratic Party
- In office 11 June 1993 – 10 June 1995
- Preceded by: Otto Graf Lambsdorff
- Succeeded by: Wolfgang Gerhardt

Minister of Foreign Affairs
- In office 18 May 1992 – 26 October 1998
- Chancellor: Helmut Kohl
- Preceded by: Hans-Dietrich Genscher
- Succeeded by: Joschka Fischer

Minister of Justice
- In office 18 January 1991 – 18 May 1992
- Chancellor: Helmut Kohl
- Preceded by: Hans A. Engelhard
- Succeeded by: Sabine Leutheusser-Schnarrenberger

President of the Federal Intelligence Service
- In office 1 January 1979 – 26 December 1982
- Chancellor: Helmut Schmidt; Helmut Kohl
- Preceded by: Gerhard Wessel
- Succeeded by: Eberhard Blum

Member of the Bundestag for North Rhine-Westphalia
- In office 10 November 1994 – 17 October 2002
- Preceded by: multi-member district
- Succeeded by: multi-member district
- Constituency: FDP List

Personal details
- Born: 17 December 1936 Metzingen, Nazi Germany
- Died: 4 March 2019 (aged 82) Sankt Augustin, Germany
- Party: Free Democratic Party (1991–2019)
- Spouse: Ursula Kinkel (m. 1962)
- Children: 4
- Education: University of Tübingen (no degree); University of Bonn; University of Cologne (Dr. iur.)
- Occupation: Politician; Lawyer; Civil Servant

Klaus Kinkel (17 December 1936 – 4 March 2019) was a German statesman, civil servant, diplomat and lawyer who served as the minister of Foreign affairs (1992–1998) and the vice chancellor of Germany (1993–1998) in the government of Helmut Kohl.

Kinkel was a career civil servant and a longtime aide to Hans-Dietrich Genscher, and served as his personal secretary in the Federal Ministry of the Interior from 1970 and in senior roles in the Foreign Office from 1974. He was President of Federal Intelligence Service from 1979 to 1982 and a state secretary in the Federal Ministry of Justice from 1982 to 1991. In 1991 he was appointed as the Federal Minister of Justice and joined the liberal Free Democratic Party (FDP) shortly after. In 1992 he became Foreign Minister, and in 1993 he also became the Vice Chancellor of Germany and the leader of the Free Democratic Party. He left the government in 1998 following its electoral defeat. Kinkel was a member of the Bundestag from 1994 to 2002, and was later active as a lawyer and philanthropist.

During his brief tenure as Minister of Justice he pressed for the extradition and criminal prosecution of deposed East German dictator Erich Honecker and sought to end the left-wing terrorism of the Red Army Faction. As Foreign Minister he is regarded as one of the most influential European politicians of the 1990s. He personified an "assertive foreign policy", increased Germany's peacekeeping engagements overseas, was at the forefront among Western leaders of building a relationship with Boris Yeltsin's newly democratic Russian Federation and pressed for Germany to be given a permanent seat on the UN Security Council. He also championed the Maastricht Treaty, the merging of the Western European Union with the EU to give the EU an independent military capability and the expansion of the EU. Kinkel played a central role in the efforts to resolve the Yugoslav Wars of the 1990s, and proposed the creation of the International Criminal Tribunal for the former Yugoslavia.

== Education ==
Kinkel was born in Metzingen, Baden-Württemberg, into a Catholic family, and grew up mostly in Hechingen, where his father Ludwig Leonhard Kinkel practised as a medical doctor and internist. His father was President of the local tennis club, and Klaus Kinkel was an able tennis player in his youth. He took his Abitur at the Staatliches Gymnasium Hechingen in 1956 and first studied medicine, then law at the universities of Tübingen and Bonn. He joined A.V. Guestfalia Tübingen, a Catholic student fraternity that is a member of the Cartellverband. Kinkel took his first juristic state exam at Tübingen, the second in Stuttgart and earned a doctorate of law in 1964 in Cologne.

== Career as a civil servant ==
In 1965, Kinkel began work at the Federal Ministry of the Interior, concentrating on the security of the civilian population (ziviler Bevölkerungsschutz). He was sent to the Landratsamt in Balingen, Baden-Württemberg until 1966. He returned to the national ministry in 1968. He was personal secretary and speechwriter for the Federal Minister, Hans-Dietrich Genscher, from 1970 to 1974, and eventually the head of the minister's office. After Genscher was appointed Foreign Minister in 1974, Kinkel held senior positions in the Federal Foreign Office, as head of the Leitungsstab and the policy planning staff (Planungsstab).

=== President of the Federal Intelligence Service ===
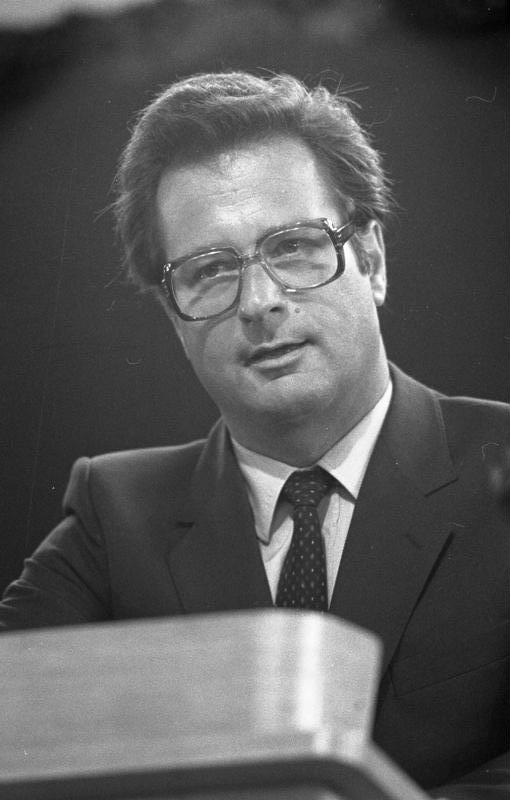
Kinkel in 1982

From 1979 to 1982 he was president of the Federal Intelligence Service (BND). He is credited with "quietly and competently" restoring confidence in the BND after a series of scandal in the preceding years. He also expanded the BND's intelligence-gathering outside of Europe.

=== State secretary ===
From 1982 to 1991, Kinkel was a state secretary (Staatssekretär) in the Federal Ministry of Justice.

== Political career ==
=== Federal Minister of Justice ===
Kinkel was Federal Minister of Justice from 18 January 1991 to 18 May 1992. Among other achievements, he took the lead in pressing for the return of Erich Honecker, the former East German leader, to face trial. He also engaged in public negotiations with the terrorist Red Army Faction, successfully urging them to renounce violence.

=== Minister of Foreign Affairs and FDP chairman ===
In a surprise decision on 29 April 1992, the members of the FDP parliamentary group rejected the nomination of Germany's designated new Foreign Minister, Irmgard Schwaetzer, and voted instead to name Kinkel to head the Federal Foreign Office.

Kinkel played a key role in the creation of the International Criminal Tribunal for the former Yugoslavia and helped to draft its statutes. He also unsuccessfully introduced a resolution at a meeting of European Community foreign ministers that would have committed each of the member countries to accept more refugees from the Balkans. Later that year, he announced Germany's wish for a permanent seat on the United Nations Security Council, arguing that Britain and France would never agree to an alternative plan under which they would merge their national seats into a single permanent seat representing the European Union. Kinkel was a signatory of the Dayton Agreement that ended the Bosnian War in 1995.

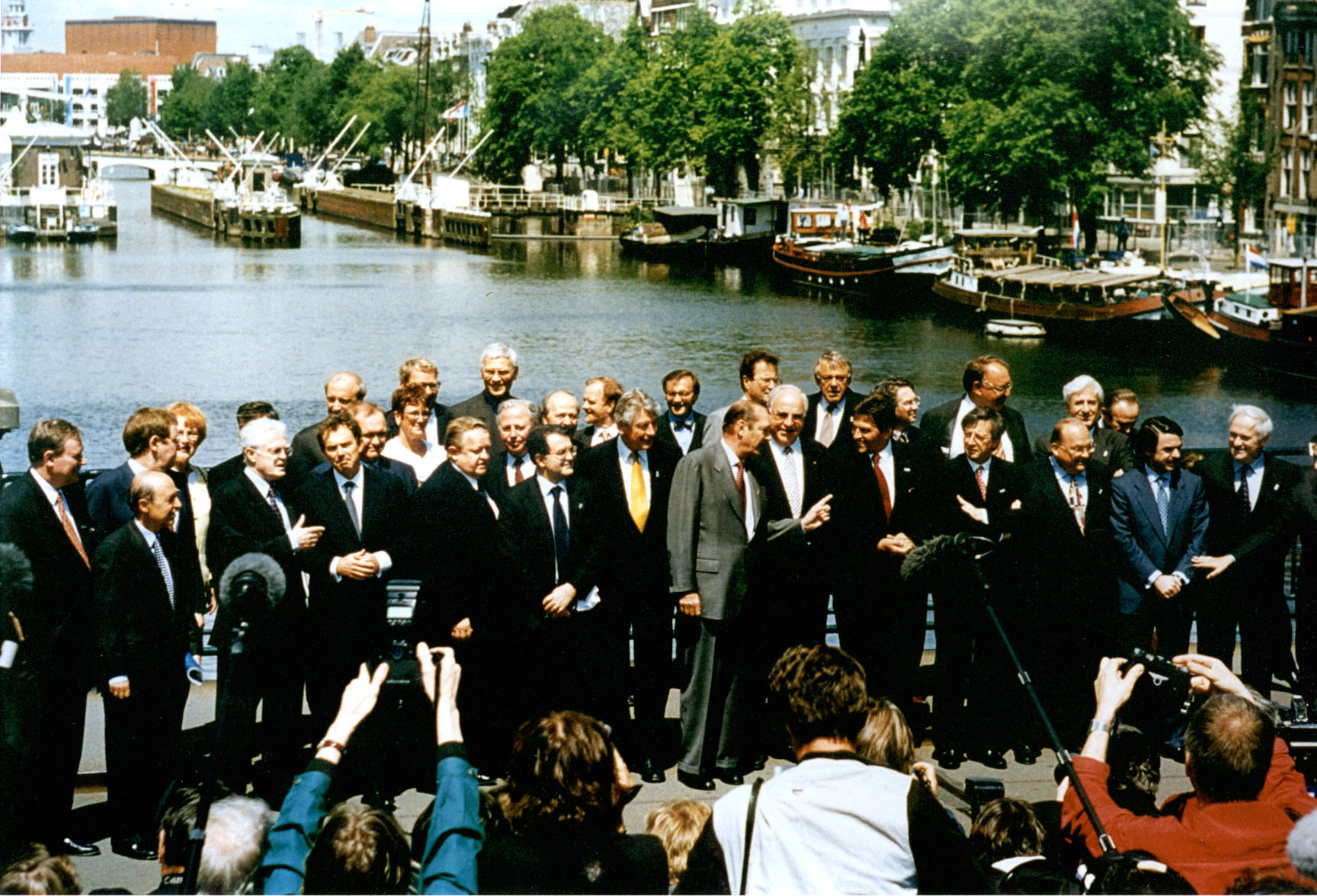
Kinkel with other European leaders during the signing of the Treaty of Amsterdam in 1997

Under the leadership of Chancellor Helmut Kohl and Kinkel, the German Bundestag in 1993 agreed on a three-point amendment to the 1949 Constitution that for the first time let German troops take part in international peacekeeping operations sanctioned by the United Nations and other bodies, subject to advance approval by parliament. Shortly after, the German Parliament approved a controversial troop deployment under the umbrella of the United Nations Operation in Somalia II, clearing the final hurdle for what was then Germany's biggest deployment of ground forces abroad since World War II. Also under Kinkel’s leadership, Germany began destroying stockpiles of tanks and other heavy weapons in the early 1990s, becoming the first country to implement the Treaty on Conventional Armed Forces in Europe.

In 1995, China dismissed a personal appeal from Kinkel to release Chinese dissident Wei Jingsheng and expelled journalist Henrik Bork, a reporter for the newspaper Frankfurter Rundschau. One year later, China abruptly canceled a planned visit to Beijing by Kinkel, citing a German parliamentary resolution that condemned China's human rights record in Tibet.

A strong supporter of European integration, Kinkel successfully advocated for Germany to ratify the Maastricht Treaty on European political and economic union in December 1992, making it the 10th of the 12 European Community nations to sign on. In 1994, he had to abandon his candidate for President of the European Commission, Prime Minister Jean-Luc Dehaene of Belgium, following protest by British Prime Minister John Major. In 1997, he argued that Turkey did not qualify because of its record on "human rights, the Kurdish question, relations with Greece and of course very clear economic questions." On Kinkel’s initiative, Germany became the first government to declare a suspension of contacts with Bosnia's envoys abroad after a recommendation made by the High Representative of the International Community in Bosnia-Herzegovina, Carlos Westendorp.

From 21 January 1993, Kinkel was also Vice Chancellor of Germany. From 1993 to 1995 he also served as chairman of the FDP. After the Free Democrats won barely enough votes to get into the Bundestag in 1994 and later lost badly in 12 out of 14 state and European Parliament elections, Kinkel announced that he would not seek re-election as party chairman. He resigned as Foreign Minister and Vice Chancellor after the government's defeat in the 1998 federal election.

=== Member of Parliament ===
Kinkel was a member of the Bundestag, the Parliament of Germany, from 1994 to 2002.

== Life after politics ==
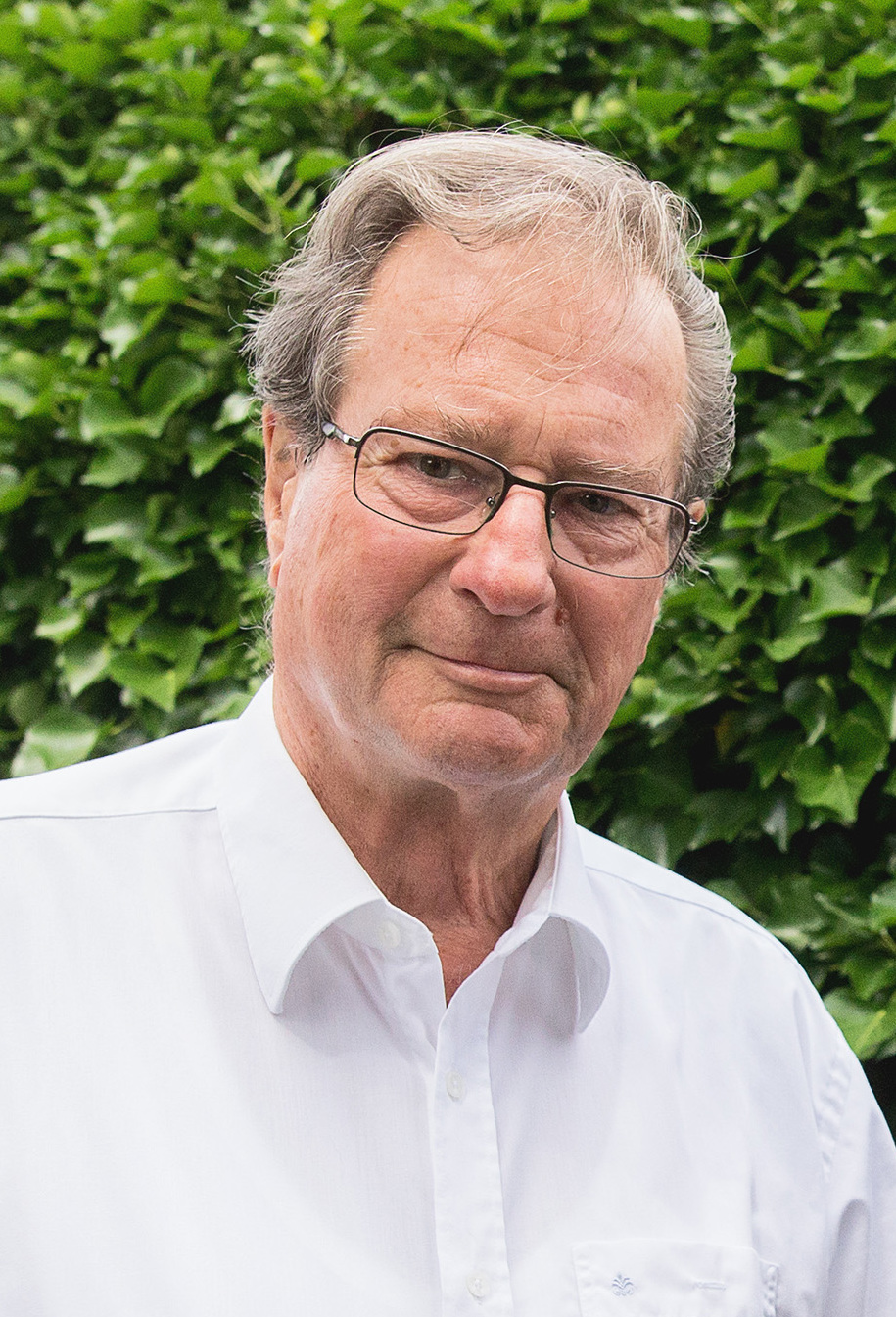
Kinkel in 2017

After leaving government in 1998, Kinkel worked as a lawyer and was engaged in a number of philanthropic and business activities, including the following:

- Bundesliga Foundation, Member of the Board of Trustees
- Sepp Herberger Foundation, Member of the Board of Trustees
- International Club La Redoute Bonn, Member of the Advisory Board
- United Nations Association of Germany (DGVN), Member of the Presidium
- Deutsche Initiative für den Nahen Osten (DINO), Member of the Board of Trustees
- Lehman Brothers, Member of European Advisory Council (since 2002)
- Deutsche Telekom Foundation, Founding Chairman of the Executive Board (2003–2014)
- EnBW, Member of the Advisory Board (2004–09)

At the request of Chancellor Angela Merkel, Kinkel represented the German government at the 2011 funeral of Sultan bin Abdulaziz, the Crown Prince of Saudi Arabia.

In November 2016, Kinkel was elected as president of a newly created ethics commission of the German Football Association (DFB); the commission is part of the DFB's declared drive for more transparency and integrity following revelations of a financial scandal around the 2006 FIFA World Cup it hosted.

== Publication ==
- "Bewegte Zeiten für Europa!", in: Robertson-von Trotha, Caroline Y. (ed.): Europa in der Welt – die Welt in Europa (= Kulturwissenschaft interdisziplinär/Interdisciplinary Studies on Culture and Society, Vol. 1), Baden-Baden 2006, ISBN 978-3-8329-1934-4

Civic offices
| Preceded by Gerhard Wessel | President of the Federal Intelligence Service; 1979–1982 | Succeeded by Eberhard Blum |
Political offices
| Preceded by Hans A. Engelhard | Federal Minister of Justice; 1991–1992 | Succeeded by Sabine Leutheusser-Schnarrenberger |
| Preceded by Hans-Dietrich Genscher | Foreign Minister of Germany; 1992–1998 | Succeeded by Joschka Fischer |
| Preceded by Jürgen Möllemann | Vice-Chancellor of Germany; 1993–1998 | Succeeded by Joschka Fischer |
Party political offices
| Preceded by Otto Graf Lambsdorff | Chairman of the Free Democratic Party; 1993–1995 | Succeeded by Wolfgang Gerhardt |
