= Richard Kauder =

World War II spy network for Nazi Germany

The Klatt Bureau (Dienststelle Klatt) was a World War II spy network for Nazi Germany led by a Jew, Richard Kauder that included many other Jews as radio operators. The network is primarily known for the Max Network of intelligence on the Soviet Military which amounted to 10,700 cables from 1942–44. British intelligence intercepted some cables with Ultra and sent a warning to Stalin regarding a high-placed mole in Stavka but the cables continued. During and after the war the true allegiance of Kauder and the Klatt Bureau was investigated by the British and the Soviets without a clear result.

The Klatt Bureau was one of the primary sources of the Foreign Armies East (FHO) and its director, Reinhard Gehlen. Gehlen made great use of cables received from the Max Network and leveraged the "success of Max" into a spymaster's reputation and a postwar career.

== Richard Kauder ==
Kauder was born in Vienna in 1900. Provided a Pacifist upbringing by his father, Kauder became a lifelong self-declared pacifist. His time in Vienna was marked by associations and friendships with idealists, some communist, some socialist, and some Zionist. Some were future spies, like Kim Philby – then with his Jewish and NKVD agent-wife Litzi Friedman. Also present then were Harry Peter Smollet – then Hans Peter Smolka, Ehud Avriel and Teddy Kollek. Teddy Kollek's career in Israeli intelligence saw him informing the CIA of Philby's communist activism, but was told by James Angleton to keep the information to himself. Ehud Avriel's connections to Kauder were instrumental in the Maxwell - Czechoslovakia weapons deal of 1948. Kauder himself was later considered by the CIA to be working with Israeli intelligence.

Smollet introduced Kauder to Otto Hatz, a Hungarian intelligence officer, who later introduced him to Momotaro Enomoto, a Japanese journalist for the well-known newspaper Mainishi Shimbun. Enomoto believed in pro-communist anarchism and was friends with Smollet. Enomoto's journalist passport allowed him to travel freely between Budapest, Vienna and Berlin. He had friends among the German elite and had unrestricted access to all Japanese ambassadors to Europe. However, he was expelled from Turkey for being a collaborator of the Japanese military attache, for whom he conducted some investigations in Turkey.

== Klatt Bureau ==
In January, 1940, Kauder was called into a meeting with Abwehr officers in Vienna. At the advice of Enomoto and Hatz he went into what he thought would be a trap for a Jew such as him. Colonel Rudolf von Marogna-Redwitz, head of the Vienna station, asked him to move to Sofia and run the Abwehr intelligence operations there, using a Japanese news service as cover. Sofia was chosen because it was the only Axis country that continued to have diplomatic relationships with the Soviet Union, and the huge staff of the Soviet embassy in Sofia included NKVD agents. Von Marogna-Redwitz informed Kauder that the idea of the Sofia base, and that Kauder should run it, was Enomoto's. Although Kauder charged for his services, he was also promised Abwehr protection for his Jewish mother. The Abwehr gave him the codename Fritz Klatt. Arriving in Sofia in 1940, he was soon after joined by both Enomoto and Hatz.

Kauder was sent initially to collect intelligence on the Bulgarian Air Force, but reported that he made contact with anti-communist Ukrainian emigre groups, who still had vast connections in Ukraine and southern Russia. The Nazis reported it up the chain of command, who promptly approved the establishment of Kauder's network.

In reality, a Japanese international news service was something the Japanese and the Nazis had been working towards for a while. Enomoto, a well placed Japanese communist loosely in the employ of Japanese Intelligence, seems to have learned of this from both Japanese sources and by overhearing a conversation. Max was thus a counterstroke against the Soviets. Kauder's network was kept secret apart from a few Abwehr officers, and was stowed away in Abwehr 2, and not in Abwehr 1 where spies belong. Kauder's cables were actually split into Max and Moritz, with Moritz focusing on the Mediterranean front. The Moritz cables are considered to have been much less accurate than the Soviet-focused Max cables.

The German decision to launch Max (and pay Kauder's hefty fees) was taken by Abwehr Director Wilhelm Canaris, who was one of the few Germans involved in the secretive joint venture with the Japanese. Otto Wagner, Kauder's initial supervisor, was not trusted by the secretive Canaris and was not read in on the Japanese connection and on how a Jew came to be working for the Nazis. Wagner would make many luckless attempts at figuring out the Kauder network, which he did not fully trust.

On May 6, 1940, Kauder brought two of his Ukrainian contacts, namely Prince Anton Turkul and Ira Longin (Ilya Longa) to meet the Abwehr officers. Turkul said he had previously worked with British intelligence, and was handled by Dickie Ellis. Turkul also informed them that he had already put his network, NTS, into existence. Turkul's past work for MI6 went a long way in establishing his credibility with the Abwehr. Enomoto then took Kauder to Salonika to meet NKVD officer Nahum Eitingon aboard a Russian merchant ship in the port. Eitingon informed Kauder that going forward he would be the only one to have any contact with the Germans. Eitingon promised Kauder personal protection. It was at this time that Kauder realized that his network was really a Soviet operation.

=== Max Operation ===
Max was probably the most sophisticated radio operation in World War Two:

Kauder now had skilled German radio operators at his disposal. He also formed his own team [of Jews] that worked with the radio operators and managed detailed records of all messages. Each message was assigned a serial number, which tracked its number within the series of messages; and a secondary catalogue number that indicated the region and location that the message referred to. The messages were also filed by date, which was of no less importance. It was an incredibly efficient and well-organized system. If asked what exactly was reported about a specific city or region, or what was reported on a specific date, Kauder could retrieve the message instantly, using his simple, intelligent and efficient filing method.

== True Allegiances ==
During the war some German officers attempted to trace the mechanics of Kauder's networks, and never found a satisfactory explanation. Nevertheless, the information was so potent that FHO refused to allow any tainting of their golden source.

After the war, the Allies interrogated Kauder and his associates and promptly concluded that the Soviets ran the entire Max operation, and that Kauder was not a professional spy but merely allowed himself to be the figurehead relaying information he received from his NKVD contacts and sources. However, the Max information was accurate, and both the NKVD and Smersh later investigated the Max network. It is possible that Stalin kept Max away from the regular organizational structures, which he never fully trusted.

It is argued that the accuracy of the Max reports were the bait that caused the FHO overreliance on Max – to the extent that Nazi officials defied Hitler's explicit directive to stop working with Kauder the Jew. This information was the bait that may have carried costs for the Soviets but was worth the payoff when it was later used as part of the Soviet Maskirovka Strategy to trap the Wehrmacht in Stalingrad, Kursk, and the Summer Offensive of 1944 (Operation Bagration). Many of the Jews who stayed alive working for Kauder later moved to Israel. Ageing Israelis have made the claim "a handful of Jews won World War Two" — slightly legitimate if Max caused the downfall of the German effort in the east, where most of the German army were destroyed.

On the other hand, Max cables clearly warned FHO regarding Operation Mars, a terrible defeat for the Red Army. This caused the British to conclude that it was impossible for Max to be a Soviet operation. However, the British may have been blinded by western ideals regarding acceptable costs of national sacrifice.

The Max Network is one of the unsolved mysteries of the war, with Kauder's loyalties and sources of information still unclear.
