= Seydlitz =

Seydlitz, von Seydlitz or von Seidlitz is a surname of Prussian, Silesian, Thuringian, Saxon and Polish nobility. It may refer to:

== People ==
- Friedrich Wilhelm von Seydlitz (1721–1773), a Prussian general of the cavalry
- Józef Seydlitz (1755–1835), a Polish military commander and a colonel of the Polish Army
- Woldemar von Seidlitz (1850–1922), an art historian
- Walther von Seydlitz-Kurzbach (1888–1976), a German general

== Ships ==
- SMS Seydlitz, a 25,000 ton battlecruiser of the Imperial German Navy
- German cruiser Seydlitz, a heavy World War II cruiser that was never completed
- German trawler V 201 Seydlitz, a World War II Vorpostenboot

== Other ==
- Seidlitz powders, a laxative and digestion regulator named after the town of Sedlec, Czech Republic
