= Astrid Dövle Dollis Dahlgren =

WW2 German spy in Sweden (1899–1981)

Astrid Døvle Dollis Dahlgren (born Astrid Døvle; nicknamed the "Scandinavian 'Mata Hari'"; 9 December 1899, Norway - 27 September 1981, Stockholm) was a Norwegian dentist and property dealer. After she became Swedish by marriage she worked for Nazi Germany during World War II.

== Life ==
Dahlgren was born in Norway in 1899 and she became a qualified dentist. She married another Norwegian dentist named Dollis. She married again in 1943 to a Swedish businessman named Dahlgren. This marriage gave her Swedish citizenship; the marriage was dissolved in 1947.

The German forensic Director, Preiss, at Gestapo RSHA Amt IV summoned Dahlgren for talks at Victoria Terrasse. She was hired to expose corruption among Germans and the Nasjonal Samling within the German administration. The Norwegian resistance designated Dahlgren as a spy in 1941.

In 1943, Dahlgren travelled to Sweden to live with her new husband, Lars Axel Dahlgren, who was a wholesaler in Djursholm. In Stockholm, she was contacted by a Swedish detective and she agreed to spy on Norway for the Swedish authorities. Dahlgren revealed, among other things, a map of the German ammunition placements. The Swedes suspected that she had been sent by the Germans to collect information about their military secrets. Dahlgren was arrested on 23 February 1944 when she tried to illegally leave the country with a "Norwegian accomplice". She was arrested on suspicion of espionage and intelligence gathering by the Swedish Secret Service. They described Dahlgren as "One of the German Gestapo's most dangerous northern agents". Nordmark District Court in Årjäng Municipality sentenced her to two years of forced labour. Dahlgren was released from the women's prison in Växjö in 1946.

Her role as a spy was unclear according to the Norwegian newspaper Morgenposten, 4 January 194?, albeit there were various charges against her made by three different organizations, including Hjemmefronten. The Norwegian lawyer, Albert Wiesener, was commissioned by Dahlgren to write her biography in an attempt to explain that she had not been an informant to the German authorities.

== Bibliography ==
- Pryser, Tore (2007). Kvinner i hemmelige tjenester: etterretning i Norden under dan annen verdenskrig (in Norwegian). Cappelen. ISBN 978-82-02-27462-7.
- Swedish Information Service (1944). News from Sweden. Swedish Consulate General.
