= Blauwkapel =

- Hamlet
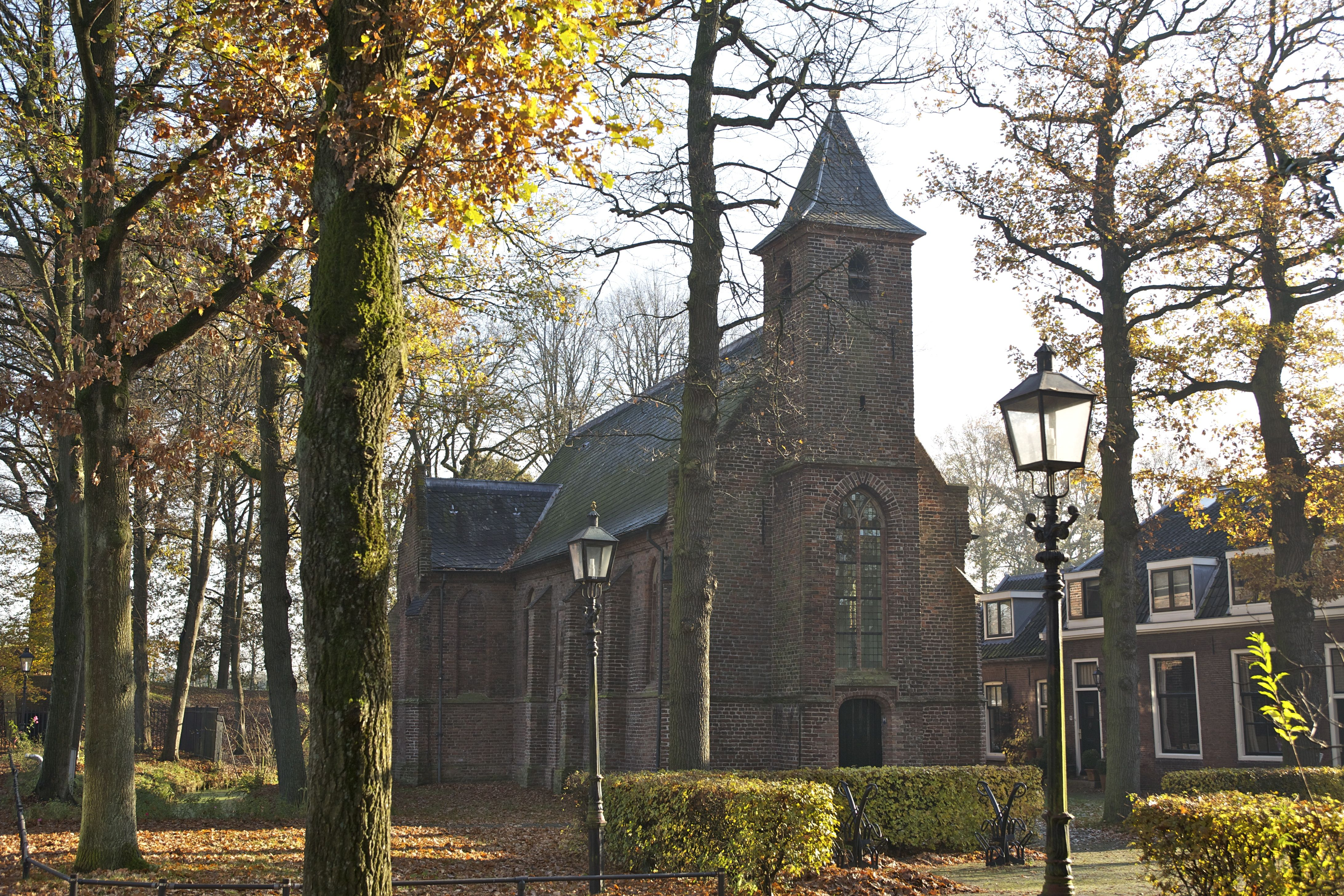

- Location in the Netherlands Blauwkapel (Netherlands)
- Coordinates: 52°6′41″N 5°8′49″E
- Country: Netherlands
- Province: Utrecht
- Municipality: De Bilt; Utrecht
- Time zone: UTC+1 (CET)
  - Summer (DST): UTC+2 (CEST)
- Postal code: 3566
- Dialing code: 030

Blauwkapel is a hamlet in the Dutch province of Utrecht. It is about 1 km north-east of the city of Utrecht. It is mainly in the municipality of de Bilt, but a small part is in the city of Utrecht.

It was first mentioned in 1575 Den blaucapel, and means blue chapel which was a privately owned chapel of the Van Wijck family which was painted blue. The village was first mentioned in 1633 as Voordorpsche Dyck, and later changed its name. The village started as a peat excavation colony. The chapel was replaced by a little church in the early 16th century. The church was heavy damaged in 1944, and restored between 1958 and 1959. In 1818, Fort Blauwkapel was built near the village, and was part of the Dutch Water Line.

Blauwkapel is not a statistical entity, and the postal authorities have placed it under Utrecht. It has its own place name signs. In 1840, it was home to 267 people. Blauwkapel forms a single urban area with the city of Utrecht, and consists of about 80 houses.

== Gallery ==
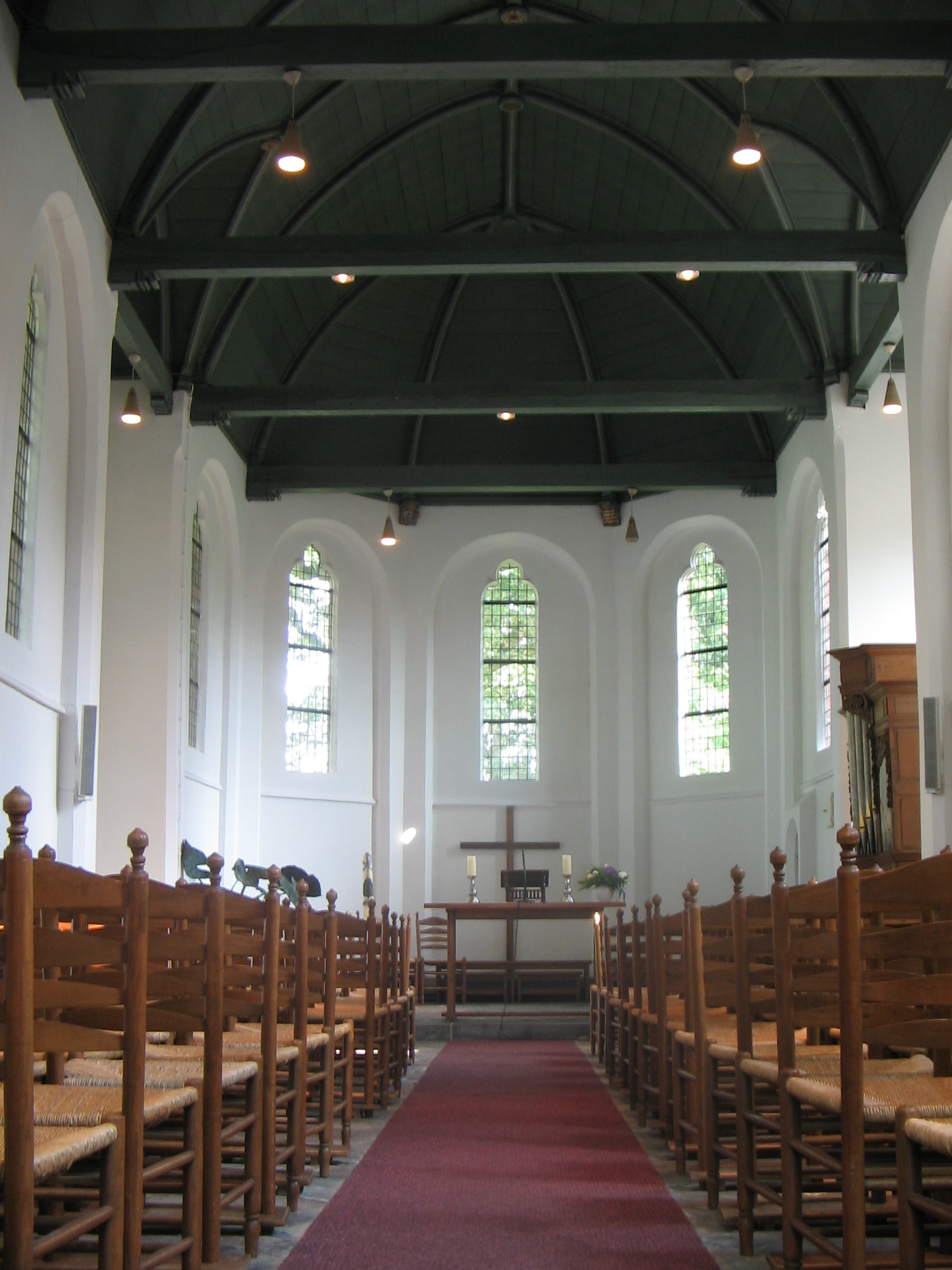
Interior of the "Blue Chapel", after which the village is named.

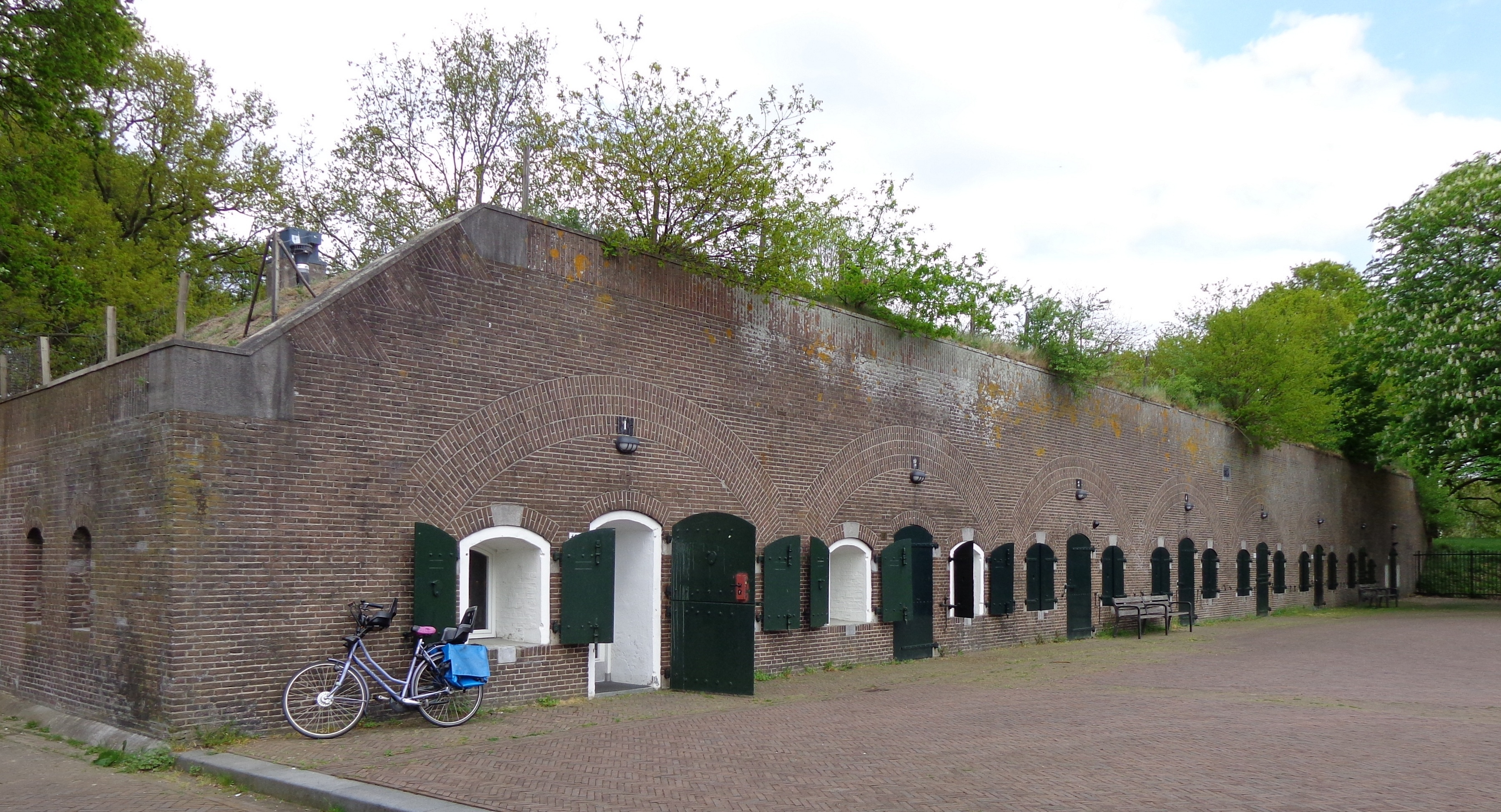
Fort Blauwkapel

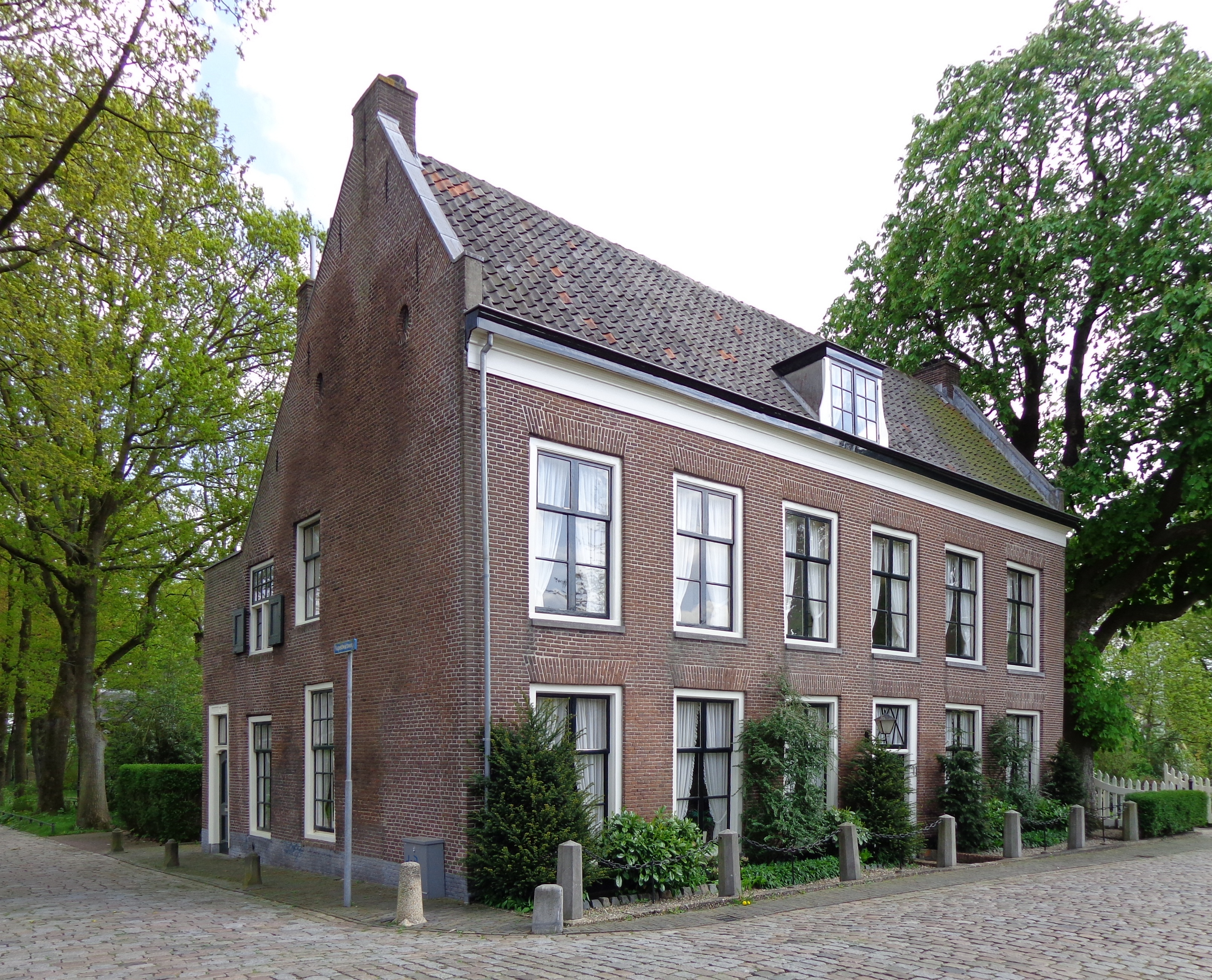
House in Blauwkapel

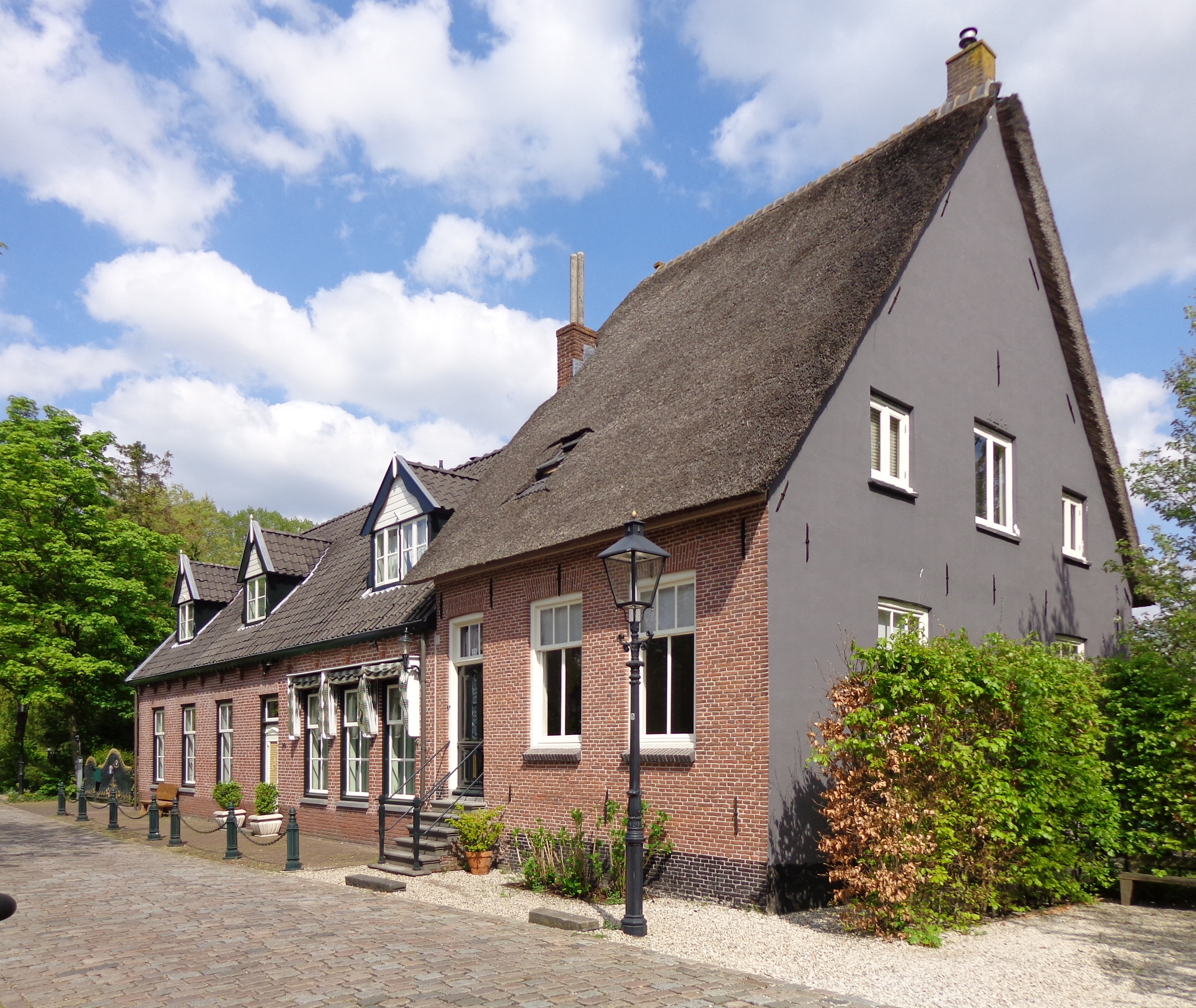
Houses in Blauwkapel
