= Johannes Clemens =

German intelligence officer (1902–1976)

Johannes "Hans" Max Clemens (February 9, 1902 – September 9, 1976) was a German functionary of respectively the SS, Sicherheitsdienst (SD, Security Service) was primarily the intelligence service of the SS and the Nazi Party in Nazi Germany. Clemens was also known as the Tiger of Como while serving as a captain in the SS. During the war, he participated in the Ardeatine massacre. Clemens, together with other SS officers, including Herbert Kappler, Karl Hass, Carl-Theodor Schütz, and Erich Priebke, formed the first firing squad, which shot the first 12 victims. After the war, however, Clemens was acquitted of involvement by an Italian military court. He was released and returned to West Germany in 1949.

Clemens joined the Gehlen Organization and with Heinz Felfe, started feeding information to the Soviets. Before this work was discovered, he worked with the successor of the Gehlen Org, the Bundesnachrichtendienst, the Federal Intelligence Service (BND), the foreign intelligence agency of the modern German government, under the control of the Chancellor's Office.

Clemens was part of a group of Soviet spies who were put on trial in 1963. His co-defendants were Heinz Felfe and Erwin Tiebel. Clemens and Felfe admitted to having transmitted great amounts of secret information to the Soviets, including 15,000 classified documents. All three were convicted, with Clemens receiving a 10-year sentence for espionage. He was released from prison on health grounds in 1968.
