= Foreign Armies East =

Military stragetic department in Nazi Germany

Foreign Armies East (German: Fremde Heere Ost (FHO), founded in 1938), operated as a military-intelligence organization of the Oberkommando des Heeres (OKH) - the Supreme High Command of the German Army before and during World War II. It focused on analyzing the Soviet Union and other East European countries before and during the war.

== Establishment ==
Fremde Heere Ost was established on 10 November 1938 as 12 Department of the General Staff of the Army, attached to the section Senior Quartermaster IV (German: Oberquartiermeister IV). It was commanded by Oberstleutnant Eberhard Kinzel from November 1938 to March 1942. Oberstleutnant Reinhard Gehlen replaced Kinzel on 1 April 1942 on the orders of Chief of the General Staff, General Franz Halder, with an initial staffing of about 35 people. Foreign Armies East was the successor organisation of Department IIIb of the German General Staff, a section since 1889, and only became a department during World War I. During World War I, the department was heavily involved in military intelligence, counter-intelligence and sabotage. Later as it developed, it became involved in propaganda as well. Its main rival and competitor was the Naval Intelligence Department, (German: Marinenachrichtendienst), a department of the Imperial German Navy. With the Treaty of Versailles, the army was drastically reduced and military intelligence was disallowed. However, a troop office, called Department T 3 (German: Truppenamt) also referred to the Army Statistical Department (German: Heeresstatistische Abteilung) was created to be the new military intelligence department, but essentially a continuation of the old department. Most of the information that came into the department came from open sources, specifically daily news and military news. For example, the officer responsible for intelligence gathering from Great Britain from sources like The Daily Telegraph, the United Services Review, the Journal of the Royal United Services Institution and the Journal of the Royal Engineers.

In 1935, the department was renamed Abteilung Fremde Heere or Department of Foreign Armies, and it was finally renamed on 10 November 1938 by Franz Halder who split it into two departments called Fremde Heere Ost and Fremde Heere West. The offices of both organizations were located at 76 Tirpitzufer in Berlin, which was and is colloquially known as Bendlerblock. Fremde Heere Ost was the third branch of the German General Staff, while Fremde Heere West was the twelfth.

FHO's initial task was the collection of statistical and technical data on the armies that Germany was at war with or countries that it had planned to invade including Poland, Scandinavia, Balkans, the Soviet Union, China, and the United States.

In July 1941 Reinhard Gehlen was attached to FHO, and by the spring of 1942 became its head. In 1942, Gehlen predicted the downfall of the Nazi state, and the coming Cold War between the United States and the Soviet Union. He planned to preserve his office of the FHO and then to present it to the US as a sort of gift.

== End of World War II ==
As the war ended, Gehlen hid himself, his staff and his microfilmed files in the chaos of the downfall of Hitler's government. General William Wilson Quinn of the US Seventh Army, recognized Gehlen's name from a report by Allen Dulles of the OSS. He ensured Gehlen and his material were brought to the attention of the US government.

Gehlen revealed his plan for Foreign Armies East to Captain John Boker of US Military Intelligence, who persuaded General Edwin Sibert of USFET to listen to Gehlen. The J-2 staff of the Pentagon was also involved. These operations eventually led to the formation of Operation X, Operation Rusty, 'the Organization', 'the Org', and finally, the 'Gehlen Organization'.

The Gehlen Organization became a powerful spy ring during the early years of the Cold War. Eventually, this organization was transformed into the Bundesnachrichtendienst, or BND, West Germany's intelligence service.

Many of the controversial aspects of Gehlen and his organization, such as its links to old Nazis, and its infiltration by Eastern bloc agents, were later described by Heinz Höhne & Hermann Zolling, in articles and a book, The General Was a Spy.

== See also ==
- Sicherheitsdienst – intelligence agency of the SS and the Nazi Party
- Ostministerium – Reich Ministry for the Occupied Eastern Territories
- Abwehr – German military intelligence organization
