= Peggy Taylor (spy) =

Peggy Taylor (December 5, 1920 – June 8, 2006) was a French World War II spy. She was known for assassinating a Nazi SS colonel when she was just 21 years old.

== Early life ==
Taylor was born Margaret Martha Gertrude Taylor on December 5, 1920. Her parents were Herbert Taylor, an English businessman, and Anne-Marie Le Coq. Margaret had one sister and two brothers. The whole family lived in the same house as Anne Marie's mother, Taylor's grandmother. Peggy was sent to a convent upon reaching adolescence, but her father had gone to Yorkshire to work for the British government during the Second World War and sent for the family soon after his arrival. Anne Marie, who could not leave her ailing mother, gave her children 9000 francs and sent them on a boat to Falmouth. Peggy and her siblings received word through the Swiss Red Cross that their mother was interned at a concentration camp near the German border.

== Life at war ==
Desperate to save their mother, Peggy, her sister, and her brother William enlisted in the Free French Forces. Peggy became a paratrooper and a spy, craftily posing as a prostitute to obtain information. Once, Peggy bicycled around the Normandy coast, blowing kisses to the German military personnel stationed there, whilst collecting information about the number and position of tanks and other military structures. This information appeared to be invaluable, as it is believed to have influenced the date of D-Day. At the age of 21, she successfully assassinated a Nazi SS colonel after earning his trust and setting up a dinner date with him. "I said 'goodbye' and he just dropped."

== After the war ==
After World War II, Taylor made the transition back to civilian life. For her military achievements she received the Croix de Guerre and the French Resistance medal twice. In 1955, Taylor emigrated to Ottawa, Canada and worked for the federal government as a stenographer. In 1995, she checked into a veterans' nursing home and died on June 8, 2006.
