= Gehlen Organization =

Intelligence agency

The Gehlen Organization or Gehlen Org (often referred to as The Org) was an intelligence agency established in June 1946 by U.S. occupation authorities in the United States zone of post-war occupied Germany, and consisted of former members of the 12th Department of the German Army General Staff (Foreign Armies East, or FHO). It was headed by Reinhard Gehlen who had previously been a Wehrmacht Major General and head of the Nazi German military intelligence in the Eastern Front during World War II.

The agency was a precursor to the Bundesnachrichtendienst (BND or Federal Intelligence Service) which was formed in 1956.

== Establishment ==
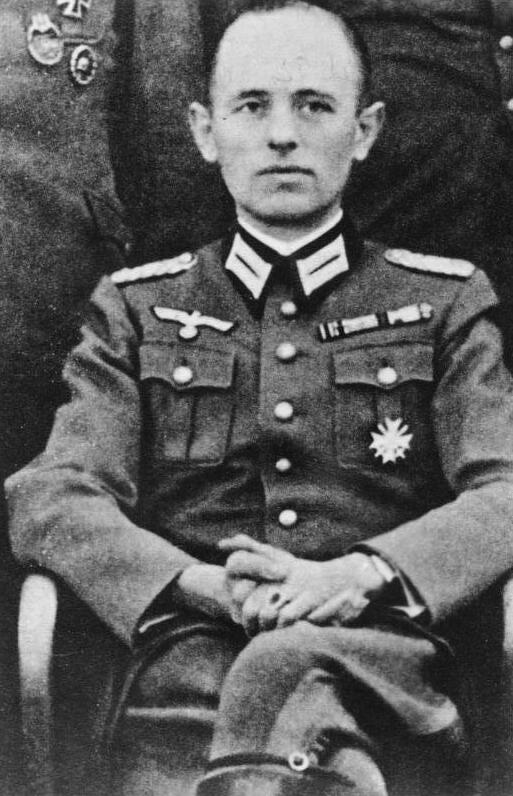
Reinhard Gehlen in 1943

After World War II, Reinhard Gehlen acted under the tutelage of US Army G-2 (intelligence), but he wished to establish an association with the Central Intelligence Agency (CIA). In 1947, in alliance with the newly created CIA, the military orientation of the organization turned increasingly toward political, economic and technical espionage against the Eastern bloc and the moniker "Pullach" became synonymous with secret service intrigues.

According to one report, the Org was for many years "the only eyes and ears of the CIA on the ground in the Soviet Bloc nations" during the Cold War. The CIA kept close tabs on the Gehlen group: the Org supplied the manpower while the CIA supplied the material needs for clandestine operations, including funding, cars and airplanes.

Every German POW returning from Soviet captivity to West Germany between 1947 and 1955 was interviewed by Org agents. Those returnees who were forced to work in Soviet industries and construction, and who were willing to participate, represented an incomparable source of information: a post-war, up-to-date picture of the Soviet Union as it evolved.

== Main operations ==
The Org had close contacts with East European émigré organizations. Unheralded tasks, such as observations of the operation of Soviet rail systems, airfields, and ports were as important as infiltration in the Baltic States using former Kriegsmarine E-boats, manned by German crews and skippered by Lieutenant-Commander Hans-Helmut Klose. Another mission by the Gehlen Organization was Operation Rusty, which carried out counter-espionage activities directed against dissident German organizations in Europe.

The anticommunist espionage networks of the Gehlen Organization remained in place after the Red Army's conquest and the consolidation of Soviet hegemony in the east of Europe.

The Org's Operation Bohemia was a major counter-espionage success. By penetrating a Czech-run operation, the Org uncovered another network – a spy ring run by the Yugoslav secret service in several cities in western Europe. The Gehlen Organization was also successful in discovering a secret Soviet assassination unit functioning under the umbrella of SMERSH. An Org informant in Prague reported that the Red Army had been issued an advanced, multi-usage detonator of Czech design but manufactured in a defense plant in Kharkiv. The CIA showed interest. Several weeks later, the Org's couriers presented the detonator, with complete technical data, to the CIA liaison staff at Pullach. Just afterwards, the Czech engineer and his family were smuggled across the frontier into West Germany and on to the United States. By identifying people who suffered under the new communist regimes in eastern Europe, the Org recruited many agents who "wished nothing more than to drive the Bolsheviks from Europe".

In 1948, the Gehlen Organization had an annual budget of US$1,500,000 (inflation adjusted US$20.1 million present day).

The Gehlen Org employed hundreds of former members of the Nazi Party, which was defended by the CIA. James Critchfield, former chief of the CIA's Near East and South Asia division, stated to The Washington Post in 2001, "I've lived with this for 50 years," and that, "Almost everything negative that has been written about Gehlen, in which he has been described as an ardent ex-Nazi, one of Hitler's war criminals – this is all far from the fact."

Gehlen discussed the Organization's work in his memoirs, published in 1977, entitled The Service: The Memoirs of General Reinhard Gehlen.

== Criticism ==
Once the Org emerged into the public eye, Gehlen and his group drew criticism from both sources in the West and the East. An article by Sefton Delmer, senior correspondent for London's Daily Express on 17 March 1952, made Gehlen public. Two and half years later, on 10 August 1954, Delmer wrote that "Gehlen and his Nazis are coming" implying in his story that a continuation of nothing less than Hitler's aims was at hand through the Org's "monstrous underground power in Germany". Mi5 documents held at the UK's National Archives suggest that members of the Gehlen Organization had spied on Delmer from at least September 1954.

In 2006, after reviewing selected declassified CIA documents on the Gehlen Org, a Guardian article offered a new perspective on this attempt to fight communism with some ex-Nazis "... for all the moral compromises involved [in hiring former Nazis], it was a complete failure in intelligence terms. The Nazis were terrible spies". Communist groups and governments castigated Gehlen's group as fanatical and virulent agents of revenge and of American imperialism.

Alois Brunner, alleged to be an Org operative, was formerly responsible for the Drancy internment camp near Paris and linked to the murders of 140,000 Jews during the Holocaust. According to Robert Wolfe, historian at the US National Archives, "US Army intelligence accepted Reinhard Gehlen's offer to furnish alleged expertise on the Red Army – and was bilked by the many mass murderers he hired". James Critchfield later went on to say in an interview with a reporter, "There's no doubt that the CIA got carried away with recruiting some pretty bad people."

The American National Security Archive states that Gehlen "employed numerous former Nazis and known war criminals". An article in Der Spiegel featured this headline on 16 February 2011: "The Nazi Criminals Who Became German Spooks". The article states:

"CIA documents turned up by the BND's historical department show that the Bundestag, Germany's parliament, was also informed about the matter. According to these documents, Reinhard Gehlen, head of the Org and later president of the BND, told the Bundestag's Committee on European Defense on Dec. 11, 1953, that around 40 of his employees came from the SS and SD. ... If there was ignorance on the matter, it was only because no one wanted to know – not Gehlen, not Adenauer, not Globke and presumably many others as well.

An article in The Independent on 29 June 2018 made this statement about some of the Org and BND employees:

"Operating until 1956, when it was superseded by the BND, the Gehlen Organisation was allowed to employ at least 100 former Gestapo or SS officers. ... Among them were Adolf Eichmann’s deputy Alois Brunner, who would go on to die of old age despite having sent more than 100,000 Jews to ghettos or internment camps, and ex-SS major Emil Augsburg. ... Many ex-Nazi functionaries including Silberbauer, the captor of Anne Frank, transferred over from the Gehlen Organisation to the BND. ... Instead of expelling them, the BND even seems to have been willing to recruit more of them – at least for a few years".

The authors of the book A Nazi Past: Recasting German Identity in Postwar Europe state that Reinhard Gehlen simply did not want to know the backgrounds of the men that the BND hired in the 1950s.

The American National Security Archive states that Gehlen "employed numerous former Nazis and known war criminals".

On the other hand, Gehlen himself was cleared by the CIA's James H. Critchfield, who worked with the Gehlen Organization from 1949 to 1956. In 2001, he said that "almost everything negative that has been written about Gehlen, as an ardent ex-Nazi, one of Hitler's war criminals ... is all far from the fact," as quoted in The Washington Post. Critchfield added that Gehlen hired former Sicherheitsdienst (Security Service of the Reichsführer-SS) men "reluctantly, under pressure from German Chancellor Konrad Adenauer to deal with 'the avalanche of subversion hitting them from East Germany'"

=== Soviet penetration of the Org ===
There were also reports of "moles" within the agency, which undermined its credibility. In fact, a CIA document published some years later spoke of a "catastrophic" Soviet penetration of the Gehlen Organization. Most of the moles were ex-Nazis recruited by the MGB. The WIN mission to Poland was a failure due to the compromising of the mission by counter-spies; as it turned out, the so-called Fifth Command of WIN organization within Poland had been created by the Soviet intelligence services.

Since the early 1950s, the Soviets were getting reports from Org insiders Heinz Felfe, Hans Clemens and Erwin Tiebel. All three were finally discovered in 1961 and tried for treason; they were convicted in 1963. Clemens and Felfe had admitted to having transmitted great amounts of secret information to the Soviets, including 15,000 classified documents.

There were also Communists and their sympathizers within the CIA and the SIS (MI6), especially Kim Philby, himself a Soviet secret agent. As such information appeared, Gehlen, personally, and the Gehlen Organisation, officially, were attacked by the governments of the Western powers. The British government was especially hostile towards Gehlen, and the politically liberal British press ensured full publication of the existence of the Gehlen Organisation, which compromised the operation.

== Reorganization ==
On 1 April 1956, the Gehlen Org was formally superseded by the Bundesnachrichtendienst (or Federal Intelligence Service) of the Federal Republic of Germany, which still exists. Reinhard Gehlen was the first president; he stepped down in 1968 after reaching retirement age.

== In popular media ==
The Gehlen Organization featured in the 2023 political thriller series Bonn – Alte Freunde, neue Feinde, set in 1954.
