= End of World War II in Europe =

Final battles as well as the surrender by Nazi Germany

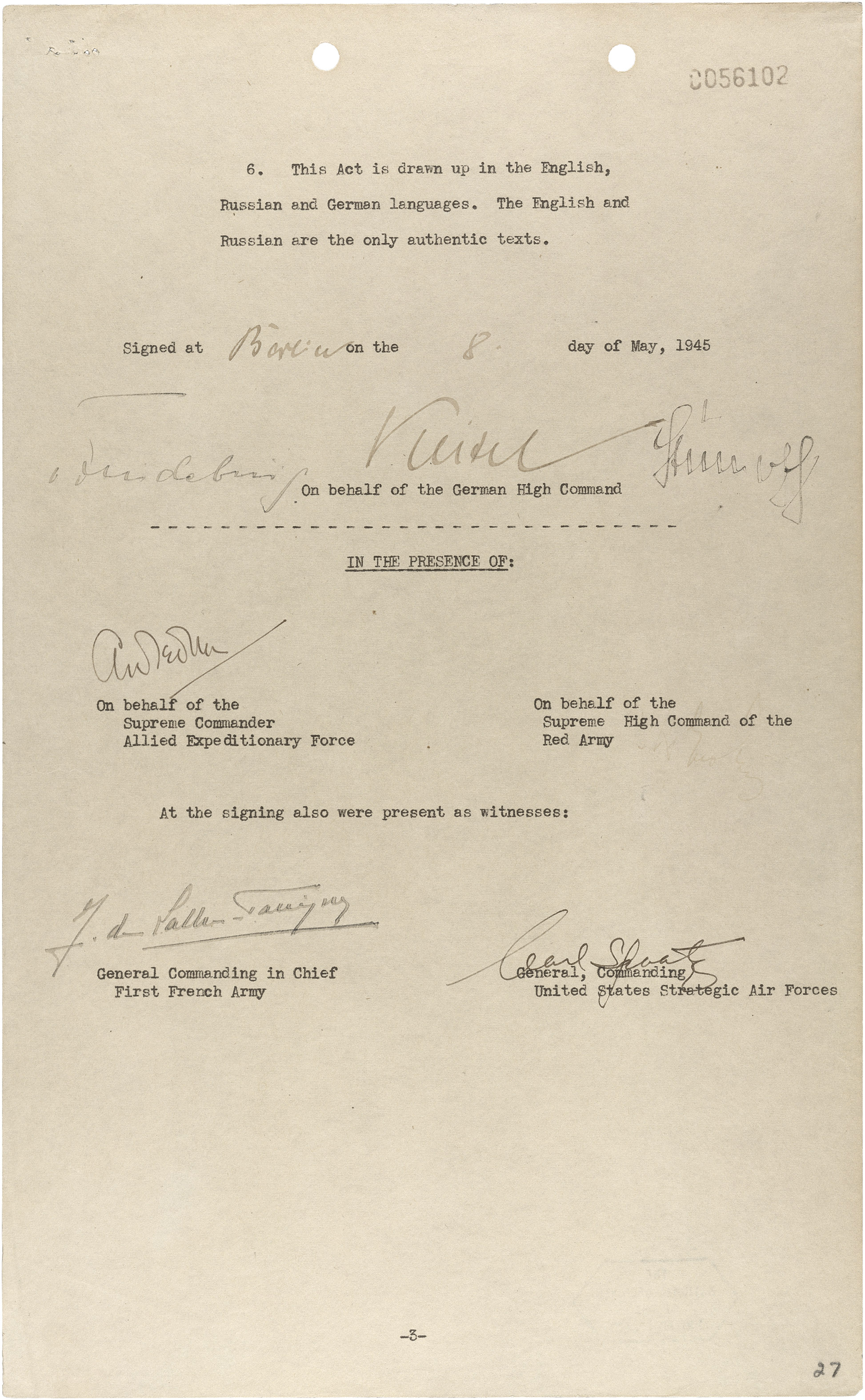
Third and last page of the instrument of unconditional surrender signed in Berlin on 8 May 1945

World War II ended in Europe in May 1945. Following the suicide of Adolf Hitler on 30 April, leadership of Nazi Germany passed to Grand Admiral Karl Dönitz and the Flensburg Government. Soviet troops captured Berlin on 2 May, and a number of German military forces surrendered over the next few days. On 8 May, Field Marshal Wilhelm Keitel signed the German Instrument of Surrender, an unconditional surrender to the Allies, in Karlshorst, Berlin. This is celebrated as Victory in Europe Day, while in Russia, 9 May is celebrated as Victory Day.

Some fighting continued after the German surrender. Some battles continued on the Eastern Front such as the Courland Pocket in western Latvia surrendering on 10 May, and the Prague offensive in Czechoslovakia ending on 11 May. On 25 May 1945, the Battle of Odžak ended in a Yugoslav Partisan victory. Following the conclusion in the European theatre, the war continued in the Pacific theatre until Japan surrendered on 2 September.

== Final events before the end of the war in Europe ==
Allied forces begin to take large numbers of Axis prisoners: The total number of prisoners taken on the Western Front in April 1945 by the Western Allies was 1,500,000. April also witnessed the capture of at least 120,000 German troops by the Western Allies in the last campaign of the war in Italy. In the three to four months up to the end of April, over 800,000 German soldiers surrendered on the Eastern Front. In early April, the first Allied-governed Rheinwiesenlager camps were established in western Germany to hold hundreds of thousands of captured or surrendered Axis Forces personnel. Supreme Headquarters Allied Expeditionary Force (SHAEF) reclassified all prisoners as Disarmed Enemy Forces, not POWs (prisoners of war). The legal fiction circumvented provisions under the Geneva Convention of 1929 on the treatment of former combatants. By October, thousands had died in the camps from starvation, exposure and disease.

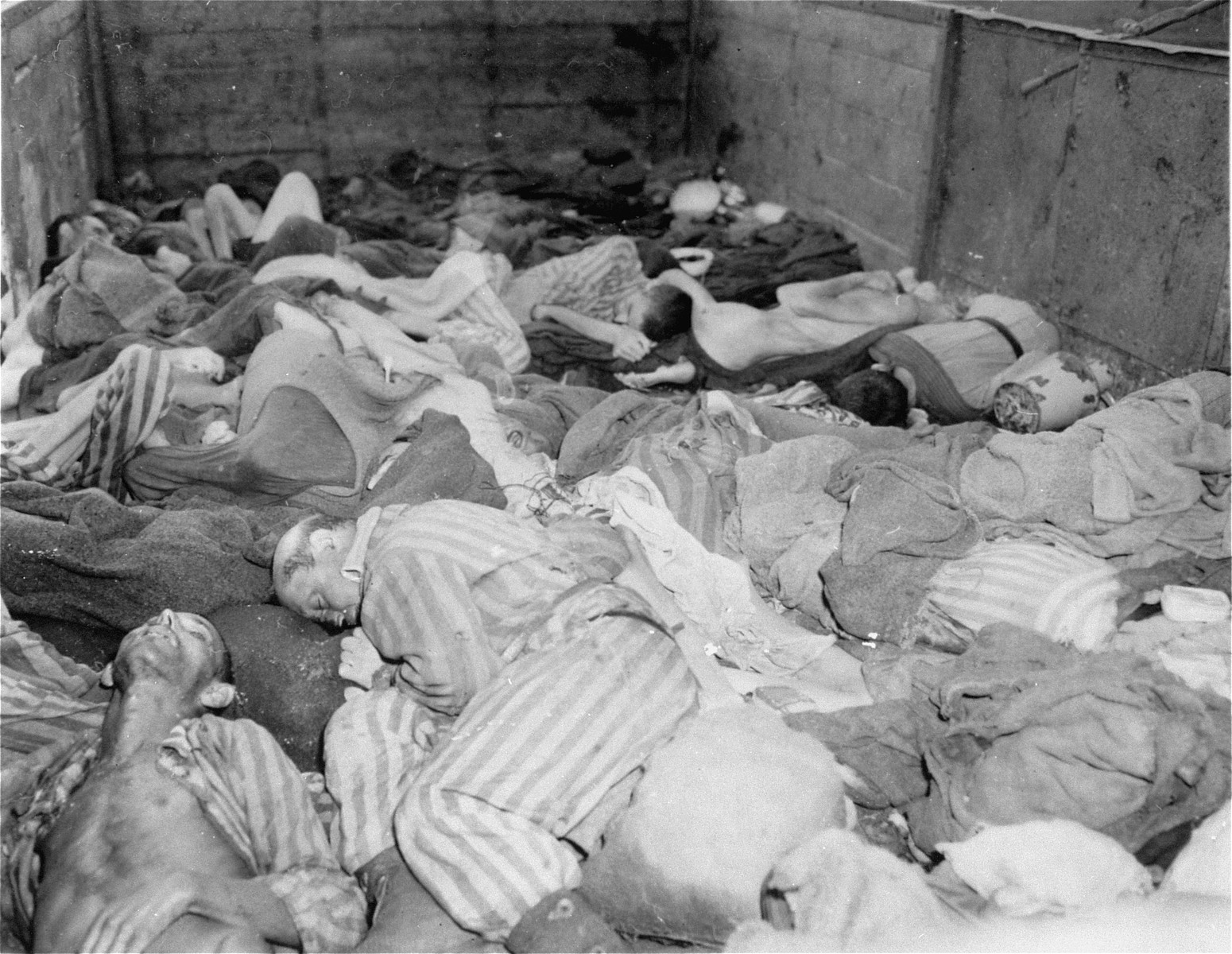
The Dachau death train consisted of nearly forty railcars containing the bodies of between 2,000 and 3,000 prisoners who were evacuated from Buchenwald on 7 April 1945.

Liberation of Nazi concentration camps and refugees: Allied forces began to discover the scale of the Holocaust, confirming the findings of Pilecki's 1943 Report. The advance into Germany uncovered numerous Nazi concentration camps and forced labour facilities. Up to 60,000 prisoners were at Bergen-Belsen when it was liberated on 15 April 1945, by the British 11th Armoured Division. Four days later troops from the American 45th Infantry Division found Dachau. Allied troops forced the remaining SS guards to gather up the corpses and place them in mass graves. Due to the prisoners' poor physical condition, thousands continued to die after liberation. Captured SS guards were subsequently tried at Allied war crime tribunals where many were sentenced to death. Some Nazi guards and personnel were killed outright upon the discovery of their crimes. However, up to 10,000 Nazi war criminals eventually fled Europe using ratlines.

German forces withdraw from Finland: On 25 April 1945, the last German troops withdrew from Finnish Lapland and made their way into occupied Norway. On 27 April 1945, the Raising the Flag on the Three-Country Cairn photograph was taken.

Mussolini is executed: On 25 April 1945, Italian partisans liberated Milan and Turin. On 27 April 1945, as Allied forces closed in on Milan, Italian dictator Benito Mussolini was captured by Italian partisans. It is disputed whether he was trying to flee from Italy to Switzerland (through the Splügen Pass), and was travelling with a German anti-aircraft battalion. On 28 April, Mussolini was executed in Giulino (a civil parish of Mezzegra); the other fascists captured with him were taken to Dongo and executed there. The bodies were then taken to Milan and hung up on the Piazzale Loreto of the city. On 29 April, Rodolfo Graziani surrendered all Fascist Italian armed forces at Caserta. This included Army Group Liguria. Graziani was the Minister of Defence for Mussolini's Italian Social Republic.

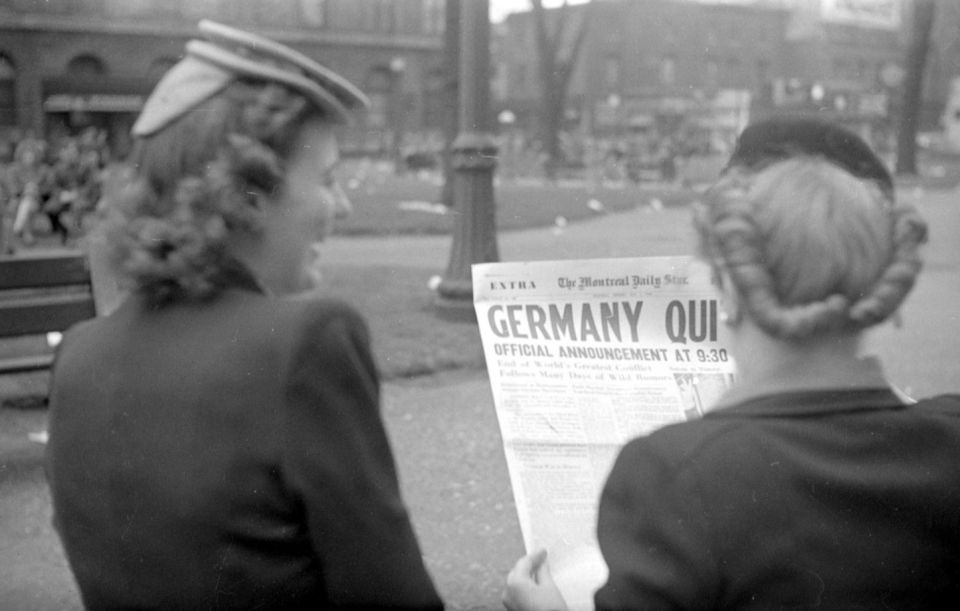
The front page of The Montreal Daily Star announcing the German surrender

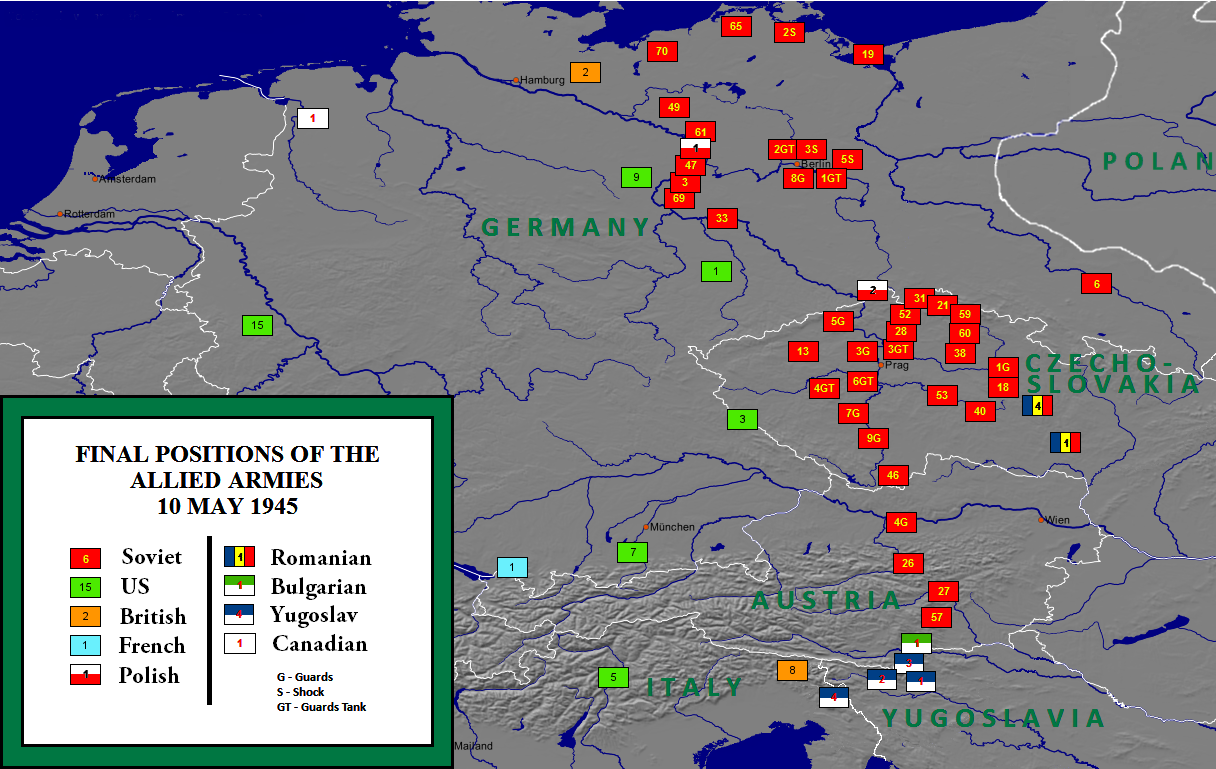
Final positions of the Allied armies, May 1945

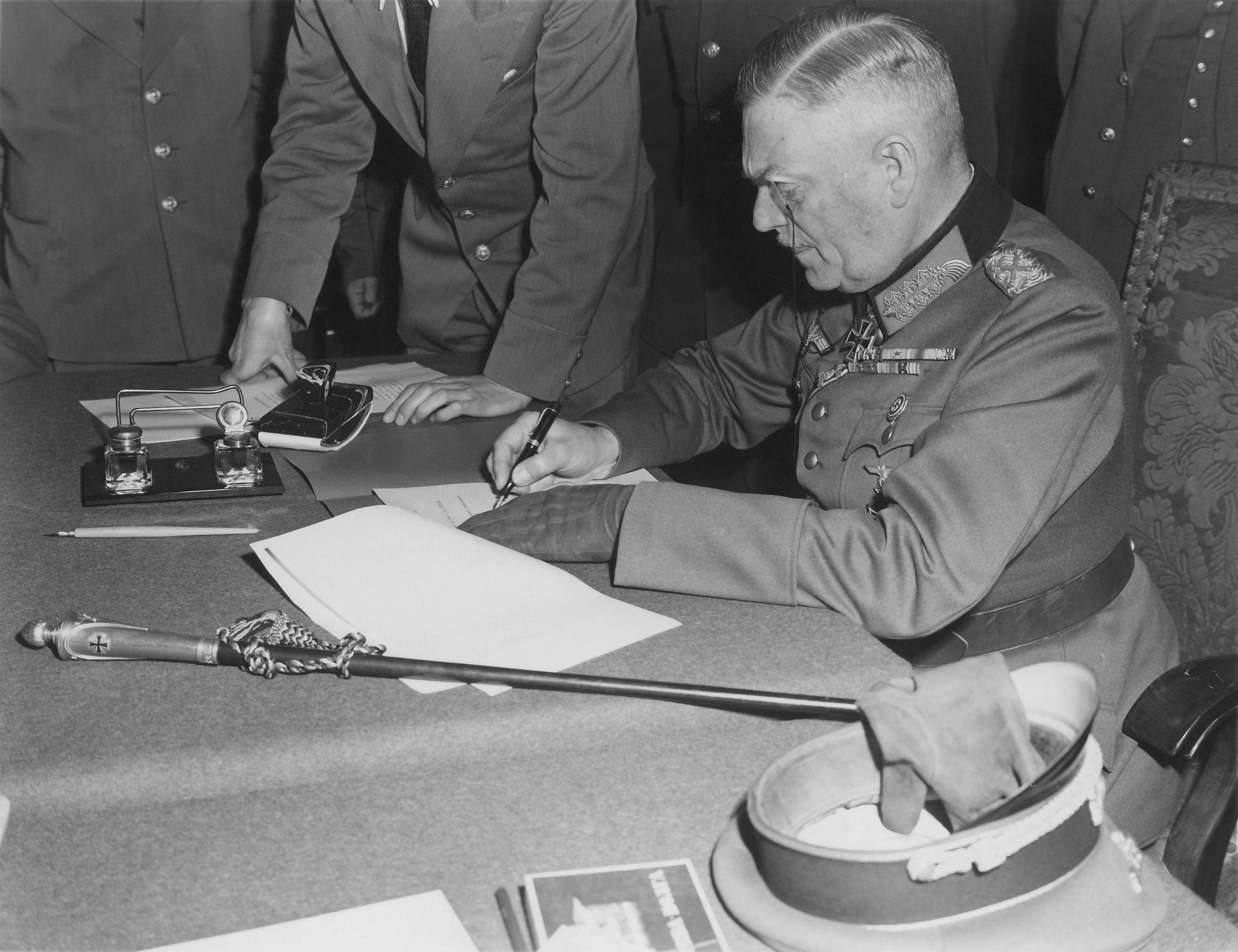
Keitel signs surrender terms, 8 May 1945 in Berlin.

Hitler commits suicide: On 30 April 1945, as the Battle of Nuremberg and the Battle of Hamburg ended with American and British occupation, the Battle in Berlin was still raging. With the Soviets surrounding Berlin and his escape route cut off by the Americans, German dictator Adolf Hitler, realizing that all was lost and not wishing to suffer Mussolini's fate, committed suicide in his Führerbunker along with his long-term partner Eva Braun, whom he had married less than 40 hours earlier. In his will, Hitler dismissed Reichsmarschall Hermann Göring, his second-in-command, and Interior minister Heinrich Himmler after each of them separately tried to seize control of the crumbling remains of Nazi Germany. Hitler appointed his successors as follows; Großadmiral Karl Dönitz as the new Reichspräsident ("President of Germany") and Joseph Goebbels as the new Reichskanzler (Chancellor of Germany). However, Goebbels died by suicide the next day, leaving Dönitz as the sole leader of Germany.

German forces in Italy surrender: On 29 April, the day before Hitler died, Oberstleutnant Schweinitz and Sturmbannführer Wenner, plenipotentiaries for Generaloberst Heinrich von Vietinghoff and SS Obergruppenführer Karl Wolff, signed a surrender document at Caserta after prolonged unauthorised secret negotiations with the Western Allies, which were viewed with great suspicion by the Soviet Union as trying to reach a separate peace. In the document, the Germans agreed to a ceasefire and surrender of all the forces under the command of Vietinghoff on 2 May at 2 pm. Accordingly, after some bitter wrangling between Wolff and Albert Kesselring in the early hours of 2 May, nearly 1,000,000 men in Italy and Austria surrendered unconditionally to British Field Marshal Sir Harold Alexander on 2 May at 2 pm.

German forces in Berlin surrender: The Battle of Berlin ended on 2 May. On that date, General der Artillerie Helmuth Weidling, the commander of the Berlin Defense Area, unconditionally surrendered the city to General Vasily Chuikov of the Red Army. On the same day the officers commanding the two armies of Army Group Vistula north of Berlin, (General Kurt von Tippelskirch, commander of the German 21st Army and General Hasso von Manteuffel, commander of Third Panzer Army), surrendered to the Western Allies. 2 May is also believed to have been the day when Hitler's deputy Martin Bormann died, from the account of Artur Axmann who saw Bormann's corpse in Berlin near the Lehrter Bahnhof railway station after encountering a Soviet Red Army patrol. Lehrter Bahnhof is close to where the remains of Bormann, confirmed as his by a DNA test in 1998, were unearthed on 7 December 1972.

German forces in Northwest Germany, Denmark, and the Netherlands surrender: On 4 May 1945, the British Field Marshal Bernard Montgomery took the unconditional military surrender at Lüneburg from Generaladmiral Hans-Georg von Friedeburg, and General Eberhard Kinzel, of all German forces "in Holland [sic], in northwest Germany including the Frisian Islands and Heligoland and all other islands, in Schleswig-Holstein, and in Denmark... includ[ing] all naval ships in these areas", at the Timeloberg on Lüneburg Heath; an area between the cities of Hamburg, Hanover and Bremen. The number of German land, sea and air forces involved in this surrender amounted to 1,000,000 men. On 5 May, Großadmiral Dönitz ordered all U-boats to cease offensive operations and return to their bases. At 16:00 on 5 May, German Oberbefehlshaber Niederlande supreme commander Generaloberst Johannes Blaskowitz surrendered to I Canadian Corps commander Lieutenant-General Charles Foulkes in the Dutch town of Wageningen, in the presence of Prince Bernhard of the Netherlands (acting as commander-in-chief of the Dutch Interior Forces).

German forces in Bavaria surrender: At 14:30 on 5 May 1945, General Hermann Foertsch surrendered all forces between the Bohemian mountains and the Upper Inn river to the American General Jacob L. Devers, commander of the American 6th Army Group.

Central Europe: On 5 May 1945, the Czech resistance started the Prague uprising. The following day, the Soviets launched the Prague offensive. In Dresden, Gauleiter Martin Mutschmann let it be known that a large-scale German offensive on the Eastern Front was about to be launched. Within two days, Mutschmann abandoned the city but was captured by Soviet troops while trying to escape.

Hermann Göring's surrender: On 6 May, Reichsmarshall and Hitler's second-in-command Hermann Göring surrendered to General Carl Spaatz, who was the commander of the operational United States Air Forces in Europe, along with his wife and daughter at the Germany-Austria border.

German forces in Breslau surrender: At 18:00 on 6 May, General Hermann Niehoff, the commandant of Breslau, a 'fortress' city surrounded and besieged for months, surrendered to the Soviets.

Jodl and Keitel surrender all German armed forces unconditionally: Thirty minutes after the fall of "Festung Breslau" (Fortress Breslau), General Alfred Jodl arrived in Reims and, following Dönitz's instructions, offered to surrender all forces fighting the Western Allies. This was exactly the same negotiating position that von Friedeburg had initially made to Montgomery, and like Montgomery, the Supreme Allied Commander, General Dwight D. Eisenhower, threatened to break off all negotiations unless the Germans agreed to a complete unconditional surrender to all the Allies on all fronts. Eisenhower explicitly told Jodl that he would order western lines closed to German soldiers, thus forcing them to surrender to the Soviets. Jodl sent a signal to Dönitz, who was in Flensburg, informing him of Eisenhower's declaration. Shortly after midnight, Dönitz, accepting the inevitable, sent a signal to Jodl authorizing the complete surrender of all German forces.

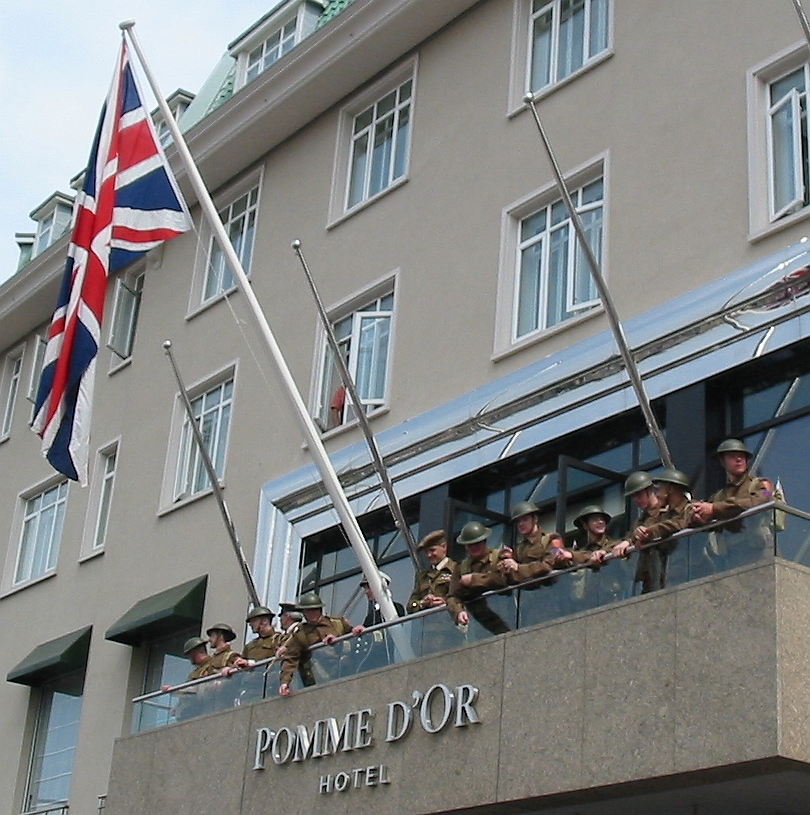
Re-enactment of the raising of the Union Jack during the Liberation of Jersey (9 May)

Channel Islanders were informed about the German surrender after: At 10:00 on 8 May, the Channel Islanders were informed by the German authorities that the war was over. British prime minister Winston Churchill made a radio broadcast at 15:00 during which he announced: "Hostilities will end officially at one minute after midnight tonight, but in the interests of saving lives the 'Cease fire' began yesterday to be sounded all along the front, and our dear Channel Islands are also to be freed today."

At 02:41 on the morning of 7 May, at SHAEF headquarters in Reims, France, the chief-of-staff of the German Armed Forces High Command, General Alfred Jodl, signed an unconditional surrender document for all German forces to the Allies. General Franz Böhme announced the unconditional surrender of German troops in Norway on 7 May. It included the phrase "All forces under German control to cease active operations at 23:01 hours Central European Time on May 8, 1945." The next day, Field Marshal Wilhelm Keitel and other German OKW representatives travelled to Berlin, and shortly before midnight signed another document of unconditional surrender, again surrendering to all the Allied forces, this time in the presence of Marshal Georgy Zhukov and representatives of SHAEF. The signing ceremony took place in a former German Army Engineering School in the Berlin district of Karlshorst; it now houses the Museum Berlin-Karlshorst.

== Aftermath of the war ==
VE-Day: Following news of the German surrender, spontaneous celebrations erupted all over the world on 7 May, including in Western Europe and the United States. As the Germans officially set the end of operations for 2301 Central European Time on 8 May, that day is celebrated across Europe as V-E Day. Most of the former Soviet Union celebrates Victory Day on 9 May, as the end of operations occurred after midnight Moscow Time.

German units cease fire: Although the military commanders of most German forces obeyed the order to surrender issued by the Oberkommando der Wehrmacht (OKW)—the German Armed Forces High Command—not all commanders did so. The largest contingent was Army Group Centre under the command of Generalfeldmarschall Ferdinand Schörner, who had been promoted to Commander-in-Chief of the Army on 30 April in Hitler's last will and testament. On 8 May, Schörner deserted his command and flew to Austria; the Soviet Army sent overwhelming force against Army Group Centre in the Prague offensive, forcing many of the German units in there to capitulate by 11 May. The other units of the Army Group which did not surrender on 8 May were forced to surrender.

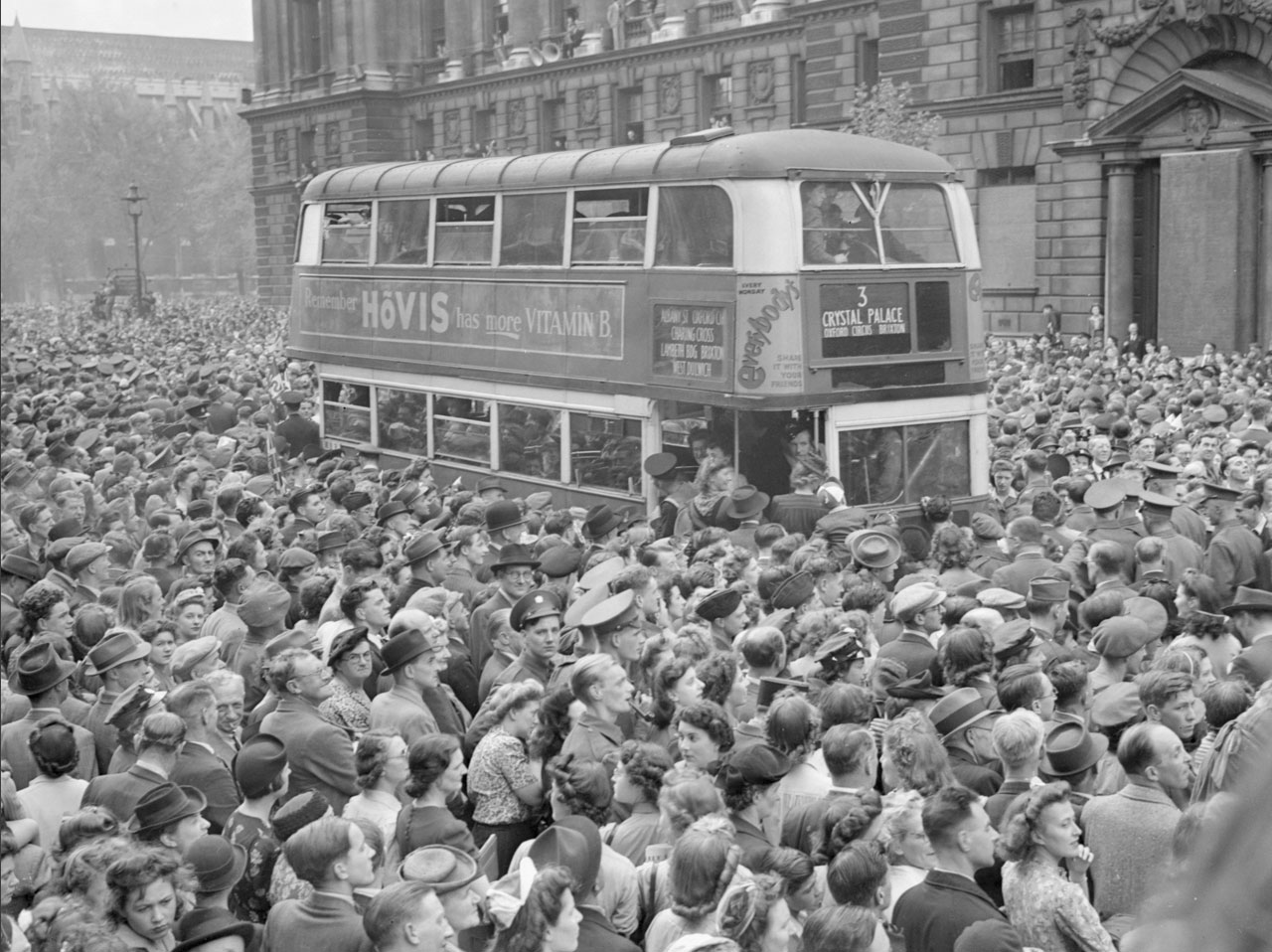
People gathered in Whitehall to hear Winston Churchill's victory speech, 8 May 1945.

- On, 9 May, the Second Army, under the command of General von Saucken, on the Heiligenbeil and Danzig beachheads, and on the Hel Peninsula surrendered; as did the forces on the Greek islands; and the garrisons of most of the last Atlantic pockets in France, in Dunkirk and La Rochelle (after the Allied siege).
- The Atlantic Pocket of Lorient surrendered on 10 May.
- The Atlantic Pocket of Saint-Nazaire surrendered on 11 May.
- The Battle of Slivice, the last battle in occupied Czechoslovakia, occurred on 12 May.
- On 13 May, the Red Army halted all offensives in Europe. Isolated pockets of resistance in Czechoslovakia were mopped up by this date.
- The garrison on Minquiers, one of the Channel Islands occupied by the Germans, surrendered on 23 May, one week after the garrison on Alderney, and two weeks after the garrisons on Guernsey and Jersey had surrendered (on 9 May) and those on Sark (on 10 May).
- A military engagement took place in Yugoslavia (today's Slovenia), on 14 and 15 May, known as the Battle of Poljana.
- The fighting during the Georgian uprising on Texel in the Netherlands lasted until 20 May.
- The last battle in Europe, the Battle of Odžak between the Yugoslav Army and the Croatian Armed Forces, concluded on 25 May. The remaining Croatian soldiers escaped to the forest.
- German forces on Ameland and Schiermonnikoog, 2 Dutch islands in the Wadden Sea, surrendered on 3 and 11 June respectively. The latter was the last German force in the Netherlands to surrender.
- A small group of German soldiers, deployed on Svalbard in Operation Haudegen to establish and man a weather station there, lost radio contact in May 1945; they surrendered to some Norwegian seal hunters on 6 September, four days after Japan formally surrendered.

Debellation: At the time the Allied powers assumed that a debellation had occurred (the end of a war caused by the complete destruction of a hostile state), and their actions during the immediate post war period were based on that legal premise (however, the German government's legal position during and following the reunification of Germany is that the state remained in existence although moribund in the immediate post war period). (Note: Although the Allied powers considered this a debellatio (The human rights dimensions of population, UNHCR web site, p. 2 § 138) other authorities have argued that the vestiges of the German state continued to exist even though the Allied Control Council governed the territory; and that eventually a fully sovereign German government resumed over a state that never ceased to exist (Junker, Detlef (2004), Junker, Detlef; Gassert, Philipp; Mausbach, Wilfried; et al. (eds.), The United States and Germany in the Era of the Cold War, 1945–1990: A Handbook, vol. 2, Cambridge University Press, co-published with German Historical Institute, Washington D.C., p. 104, ISBN 0-521-79112-X.))

Dönitz government ordered dissolved by Eisenhower: Karl Dönitz continued to act as if he were the German head of state, but his Flensburg Government (so called because it was based at Flensburg in northern Germany and controlled only a small area around the town), was not recognized by the Allies. On 12 May an Allied liaison team arrived in Flensburg and took quarters aboard the passenger ship Patria. The liaison officers and the Supreme Allied Headquarters soon realized that they had no need to act through the Flensburg government and that its members should be arrested. On 23 May, acting on SHAEF's orders and with the approval of the Soviets, American Major General Rooks summoned Dönitz aboard the Patria and communicated to him that he and all the members of his Government were under arrest and that their government was dissolved. The Allies had a problem because they realized that although the German armed forces had surrendered unconditionally, SHAEF had failed to use the document created by the "European Advisory Commission" (EAC) and so there had been no formal surrender by the civilian German government. This was considered a very important issue, because just as the civilian, but not military, surrender in 1918 had been used by Hitler to create the "stab in the back" argument, the Allies did not want to give any future hostile German regime a legal argument to resurrect an old quarrel.

On 20 September 1945, the Allied Control Council passed its Control Council Law No. 1 - Repealing of Nazi Laws, which repealed numerous pieces of legislation enacted by the national-socialist regime, putting a de jure end to the Government of Nazi Germany. Incidentally, this law should have theoretically reestablished the Weimar Constitution; however, this constitution stayed irrelevant on the grounds of the powers of the Allied Control Council acting as occupying forces. On 10 October 1945, Control Council Law No. 2 was also passed, formally abolishing all national-socialist organisations.

The Declaration Regarding the Defeat of Germany and the Assumption of Supreme Authority by Allied Powers was signed by the four Allies on 5 June. It included the following:

The Governments of the United States of America, the Union of Soviet Socialist Republics, the United Kingdom and the Provisional Government of the French Republic, hereby assume supreme authority with respect to Germany, including all the powers possessed by the German Government, the High Command and any state, municipal, or local government or authority. The assumption, for the purposes stated above, of the said authority and powers does not effect (Note: Spelling as in the original: effect, not affect.) the annexation of Germany [i.e., the document does not authorize the Allies to annex Germany].

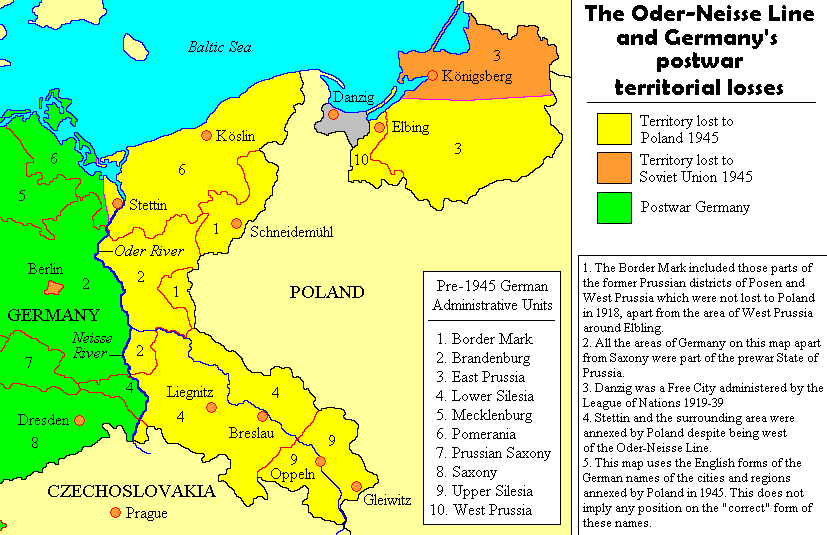
The Oder-Neisse Line

The Potsdam Agreement was signed on 1 August 1945. In connection with this, the leaders of the United States, Britain and the Soviet Union planned the new postwar German government, resettled war territory boundaries, de facto annexed a quarter of pre-war Germany situated east of the Oder–Neisse line, and mandated and organized the expulsion of the millions of Germans who remained in the annexed territories and elsewhere in the east. They also ordered German demilitarization, denazification, industrial disarmament and settlements of war reparations. But, as France (at American insistence) had not been invited to the Potsdam Conference, so the French representatives on the Allied Control Council subsequently refused to recognise any obligation to implement the Potsdam Agreement; with the consequence that much of the programme envisaged at Potsdam, for the establishment of a German government and state adequate for accepting a peace settlement, remained a dead letter.

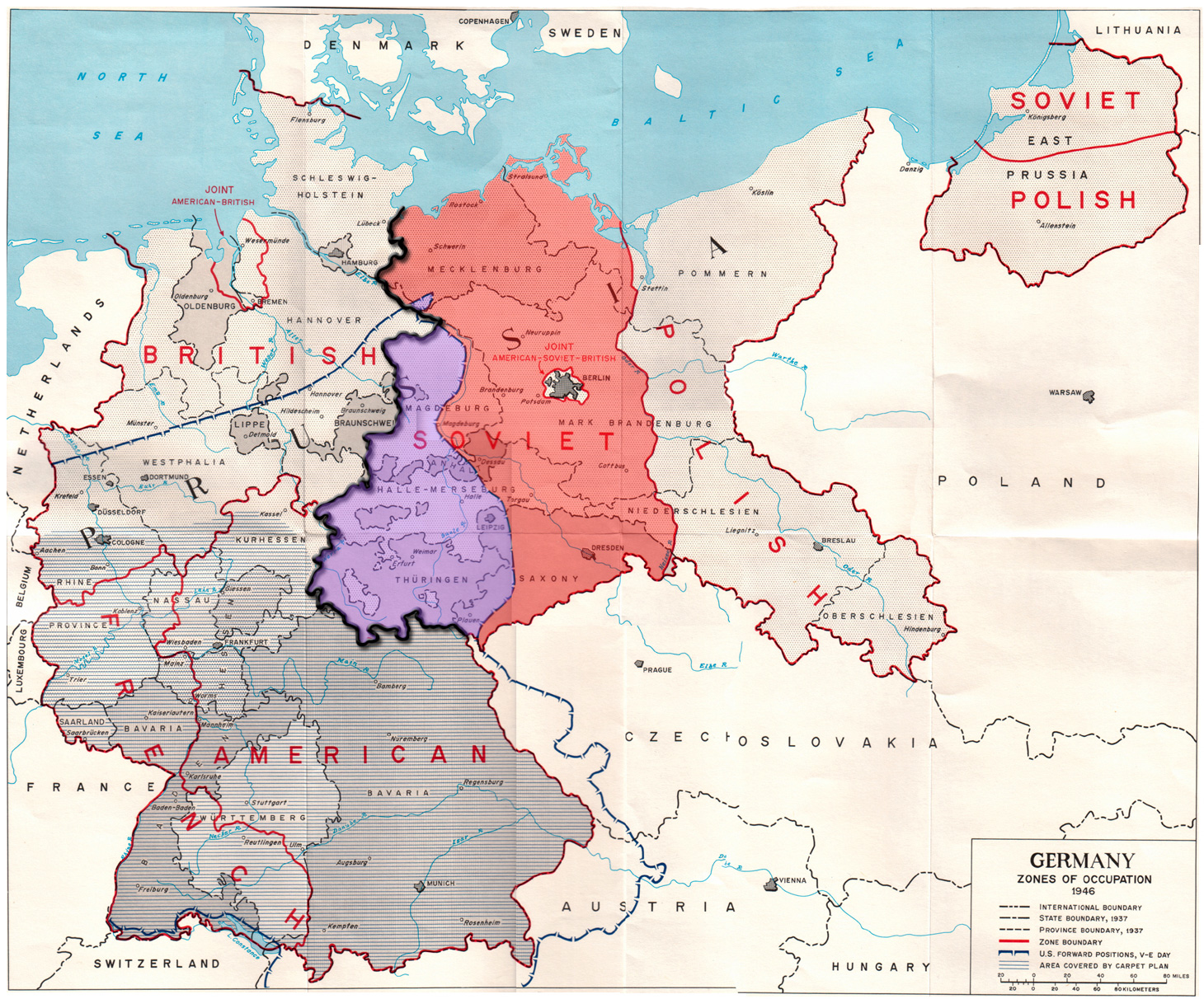
The Allied zones of occupation in post-war Germany, highlighting the Soviet zone (red), the inner German border (heavy black line) and the zone from which British and US troops withdrew in July 1945 (purple). The provincial boundaries are those of pre-Nazi Weimar Germany, before the present Länder were established.

The Allies initiated a mandatory repatriation of Soviet citizens following the Yalta Conference. These included 4.2 million Soviet prisoners of war, Ostarbeiters, and collaborators. While roughly 80 percent returned voluntarily, Western Allies initially used force to transfer those who resisted. Notable instances of forced transfers included the British handover of collaborationist Cossack formations in May and June 1945 and Operation Keelhaul in 1946 to 1947, which targeted remaining military collaborator. Declassified archives disprove claims of universal, immediate persecution for the returnees. 58 percent of returnees were cleared and able to return home. Officials mobilized 33.5 percent, primarily former POWs, into the Red Army or construction battalions for forced labor, and transferred 6.5 percent to NKVD special camps. Rank-and-file military collaborators received six-year terms in special settlements, and the state prosecuted officers and civilian collaborators in positions of authority sentencing them to the Gulag. Returning civilians and former POWs faced extortion, heavy labor, and social stigma that forced many to hide their pasts.

The Allied Control Council was created to effect the Allies' assumed supreme authority over Germany, specifically to implement their assumed joint authority over Germany. On 30 August, the Control Council constituted itself and issued its first proclamation, which informed the German people of the council's existence and asserted that the commands and directives issued by the Commanders-in-Chief in their respective zones were not affected by the establishment of the council.

== Cessation of formal hostilities and peace treaties ==
Cessation of hostilities between the United States and Germany was proclaimed on 13 December 1946 by US President Truman.

The Paris Peace Conference ended on 10 February 1947 with the signing of peace treaties by the wartime Allies with the former European Axis powers (Italy, Romania, Hungary and Bulgaria) and their co-belligerent ally Finland.

The Federal Republic of Germany, which had been founded on 23 May 1949 (when its Basic Law was promulgated), had its first government formed on 20 September 1949 while the German Democratic Republic was formed on 7 October.

End of state of war with Germany was declared by many former Western Allies from 1950. In the Petersberg Agreement of 22 November 1949, it was noted that the West German government wanted an end to the state of war, but the request could not be granted. The US state of war with Germany was being maintained for legal reasons, and though it was softened somewhat it was not suspended since "the US wants to retain a legal basis for keeping a US force in Western Germany". At a meeting for the foreign ministers of France, the UK, and the US in New York from 12 September – 19 December 1950, it was stated that among other measures to strengthen West Germany's position in the Cold War that the western allies would "end by legislation the state of war with Germany". In 1951, many former Western Allies did end their state of war with Germany: Australia (9 July), Canada, Italy, New Zealand, the Netherlands (26 July), South Africa, the United Kingdom (9 July), and the United States (19 October). The state of war between Germany and the Soviet Union was ended in early 1955.

"The full authority of a sovereign state" was granted to the Federal Republic of Germany on 5 May 1955 under the terms of the Bonn–Paris conventions. The treaty ended the military occupation of West German territory, but the three occupying powers retained some special rights, e.g. vis-à-vis West Berlin.

The Treaty on the Final Settlement with Respect to Germany was signed following the 1990 German reunification, whereby the Four Powers renounced all rights they formerly held in the newly single country, including Berlin. The treaty came into force on 15 March 1991. Under the terms of the Treaty, the Allies were allowed to keep troops in Berlin until the end of 1994 (articles 4 and 5). In accordance with the Treaty, occupying troops were withdrawn by that deadline.

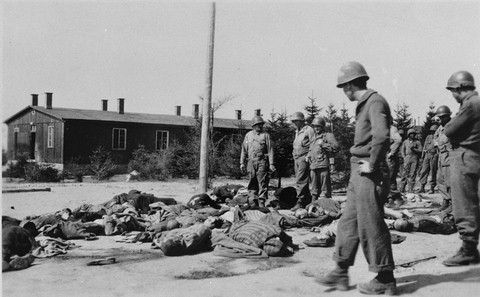
US soldiers view the corpses of prisoners which lie strewn along the road in the newly liberated Ohrdruf concentration camp.

== See also ==
- Aftermath of World War II – Events after the end of the war in 1945
- Allied Commissions – Post-World War II group responsible for administering defeated Axis territories
- Council of Foreign Ministers – Series of international conferences
- Charles Thau
- Democracy in Europe
- End of World War II in Asia – Aspect of Asian history
- German Instrument of Surrender – 1945 agreement ending WWII in Europe
- German prisoners of war in northwest Europe – Gernan surrenders on the Western Front of World War II
- Liberation of France – End of Nazi occupation during World War II
- Line of Contact – Farthest advance into German territory at the end of WWII
- Surrender of Japan – End of World War II
- Western betrayal – Concept in international relations among European countries
- Zero hour (1945) – German term for midnight on 8 May 1945 in Germany
