= Fritz Poleck =

- Image of Poleck, likely taken upon his capture in May 1945
- Born: 8 November 1905; Leszno
- Died: 27 November 1989 (aged 84)
- Allegiance: Nazi Germany
- Branch: German Army
- Service years: 1938–1945
- Rank: Major General
- Known for: Surrender at Lüneberg Heath
- Awards: Iron Cross (1st and 2nd Class); German Cross (In Gold)

Peter Fritz Theodor Wilhelm Hans Poleck (8 November 1905 in Lissa – 27 November 1989) was a German Army officer during World War II. He was notable for being a delegate at the German surrender at Lüneburg Heath as a member of the Oberkommando der Wehrmacht (OKW) command group.

== Military service ==
Fritz Poleck belonged from 10 November 1938 to 31 March 1941 to the OKW. He was commanded on 1 April 1941 as First General Staff Officer (Ia) to the 170th Infantry Division (Wehrmacht). With effect from 15 April 1943, its displacement was carried out in the guide reserve of the OKH. By 21 May 1943, he returned as a Quartermaster to the German General Staff.

In this service position he was promoted in accordance with decision of 9 May 1945 retroactive to 20 April 1945 to major general.

=== Signing of the Partial surrender ===
On 4 May 1945 on the Timeloberg at Wendisch Evern he was a signatory to the unconditional surrender to the British of the German forces in the Netherlands, in north west Germany including all islands, and in Denmark and all naval ships in those areas, with Admiral Hans-Georg von Friedeburg, General Eberhard Kinzel, Rear Admiral Gerhard Wagner and Major Hans Jochen Friedel.

== Postwar ==
After his release from captivity in 1947 Poleck completed a business training, which he finished on September 30, 1949. In October 1950 he joined the Gehlen Organization, the forerunner of the Federal Intelligence Service. In 1957, he joined the Bundeswehr. On 7 November 1957 Federal President Theodor Heuss appointed Fritz Poleck to colonel. Poleck worked officially for the office for military customer. On 31 March 1964 Poleck retired from active service. He died on 27 November 1989.

== Personal life ==
He was Protestant and until his death in 1989 married with Ilse Poleck née Roeder. They had three sons.

== Awards ==
- Iron Cross (1939)
  - 2nd Class (25 June 1940)
  - 1st Class (5 August 1941)
- German Cross in Gold (12 March 1942)
- Order of Merit of the Federal Republic of Germany

== Literature ==
Klaus D. Patzwall, Veit Scherzer: Das Deutsche Kreuz 1941-1945. Band II: Geschichte und Inhaber. Verlag Klaus D. Patzwall, Norderstedt 2001, ISBN 3-931533-45-X, S. 356.
