= 337th Division =

337th Division may refer to:

- 337th Infantry Division, Wehrmacht, Germany, 1940–1944
- 337th Volksgrenadier Division, Wehrmacht, Germany, 1944–1945
- 337th Rifle Division, Soviet Union

== See also ==
- List of military divisions by number
