= James Ewart =

James Ewart may refer to:

- James Cossar Ewart (1851–1933), Scottish zoologist
- James Oliver Ewart (1917–1945), British Army intelligence officer
