= Becklingen War Cemetery =

British military cemetery in Germany

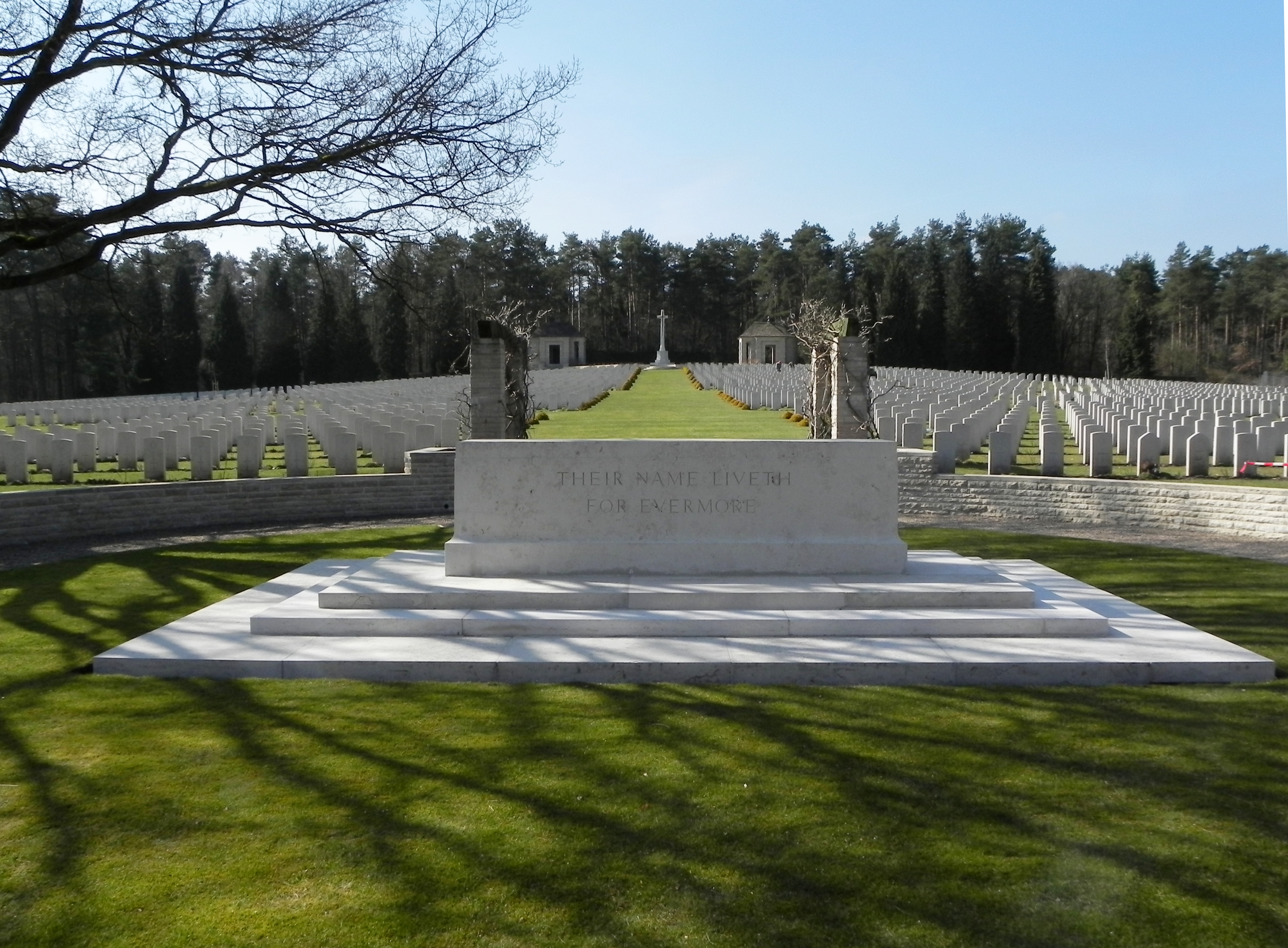
- Becklingen War Cemetery – altar stone with inscription
- Interactive map of Becklingen War Cemetery

Details
- Location: Lüneburg Heath, Lower Saxony
- Country: Germany
- Coordinates: 52.8897°N 9.9161°E
- Type: Allied Military of World War II
- No. of graves: 2,401
- Find a Grave: Becklingen War Cemetery

The Becklingen War Cemetery is a military cemetery located in the state of Lower Saxony in north Germany on the Lüneburg Heath. It was built by the Commonwealth War Graves Commission who continue to look after it today. The cemetery lies near Getrudenhof near the village of Becklingen and just north of the former British Army base of Hohne Station where the Headquarters of 7th Armoured Brigade and several brigade units were based until 2015, before the brigade moved back to the UK.

== History ==
This Commonwealth war cemetery was laid out in 1951 on a gentle slope enabling a good view across the Lüneburg Heath. This site was chosen because the terrain resembled the Timeloberg hill on the edge of the village of Wendisch Evern. It was at Timeloberg on 4 May 1945 that a German delegation headed by General Admiral Hans-Georg von Friedeburg signed the unconditional surrender of German forces in the north German region, in the presence of Field Marshal Bernard Montgomery.

== Origin ==
The Becklingen War Cemetery in the Lüneburg Heath was an amalgamation of several smaller cemeteries and individual graves within a radius of about 80 km, in which fallen soldiers and prisoners of war from the Second World War had been interred. Most of those buried here died in the final two months of the war. A total of 2,086 British, 140 Canadian, 79 Australian, 38 New Zealand, 2 South African, 1 Greek, 19 Polish, 5 Russian, 2 Yugoslav war dead and 29 persons of unknown nationality have their final resting place in this cemetery.

== Layout ==
Like almost all CWGC war cemeteries the layout follows standard guidelines. Its architectural design stems from the British architect Philip Dalton Hepworth. Cemeteries based on his design comprise two central elements and a memorial hall, rows of gravestones and a simple lawn layout.

=== Central structure ===
The large Cross of Sacrifice with its crusader sword and the altar stone are aligned on the same axis and linked by a wide swathe of grass. The altar stone, with the inscription "Their Name Liveth For Evermore", was built on circular bed created especially for it. On both sides of the St. Patrick's cross there are two low buildings; one houses the register of graves and is open to the public.

=== Gravestones ===
The gravestones are laid out in rows to the right and left of the central grass strip which runs in a straight line from the altar to the high cross. They are made of white sandstone and are inscribed, from top to bottom, with the unit, name and rank, religion or medal (Victoria Cross or George Cross only) (if known) and a memorial verse by the relatives (as desired).

=== Grassed areas ===
The gravestones are set at ground level and surrounded by small beds. The whole cemetery is grassed, a few individual trees breaking the view. The graves, bushes and trees are laid out with precise symmetry and there are only a few flowers.

== Remembrance ==
Due to its proximity to the brigade's home, the cemetery was the location for the main military Remembrance Sunday service held by 7th Armoured Brigade each year until the brigade moved back to the United Kingdom in 2015.

== Sources ==
- Der 2. Weltkrieg, Bilder – Daten – Dokumente, C. Bertelsmann Verlag, München 1983, ISBN 3-570-01403-7
