= Poleck =

Poleck is a surname. Notable people with the surname include:

- Fritz Poleck (1905–1989), German army officer
- Theodor Poleck (1821–1906), German chemist and pharmacist
