= Sidney Cornell =

British soldier (1914–1945)

Sidney Cornell (26 December 1914 - 7 April 1945) was a British soldier who served during World War II.

== Biography ==
Sidney Cornell was born in Portsmouth to an African American father on 26 December 1914. He later joined the British airborne forces and showed a strong passion for flying. In 1943, he attended parachute training and his report stated that he was the best performer.

Cornell was posted to the 7th Parachute Battalion as a company runner and took part in the Normandy campaign. He saw action at Le Mariquet woods and Le Bois de Bavent. Cornell was wounded four times but continued fighting. For his brave conduct he was awarded with the Distinguished Conduct Medal in February 1945 and received a promotion to the rank of sergeant.

Cornell saw further action during the Battle of the Bulge and took part in Operation Varsity in March 1945. During this operation, Cornell’s battalion was tasked with securing a bridge in the German city of Neustadt. A local civilian warned Cornell’s commanding officer, Major Reid, that the bridge would be blown. Reid decided to rush to the bridge and attempt to capture it intact before it could be destroyed. A small group of men made it across the bridge but many others, including Cornell, died when German forces blew up the bridge.

He was given a field burial next to the bridge along with the other members of B Coy who were killed. He is now buried at Becklingen War Cemetery overlooking Luneberg Heath, Germany.

== In popular culture ==
- The 2021 video game Call of Duty: Vanguard features a character loosely based on Cornell named Arthur Kingsley.
- In 2019, a biographical film of Cornell's life entitled Paratrooper was announced to star Tobi Bakare.
- Sidney Cornell makes an appearance in the video game Enlisted as part of the 7th Parachute Battalion
