= German surrender at Lüneburg Heath =

Surrender of German armed forces in Belgium, Denmark, and northwest Germany on 4 May 1945

Instrument of Surrender of Germany
Instrument of Surrender of all German armed forces in Holland, in northwest Germany including all islands, and in Denmark
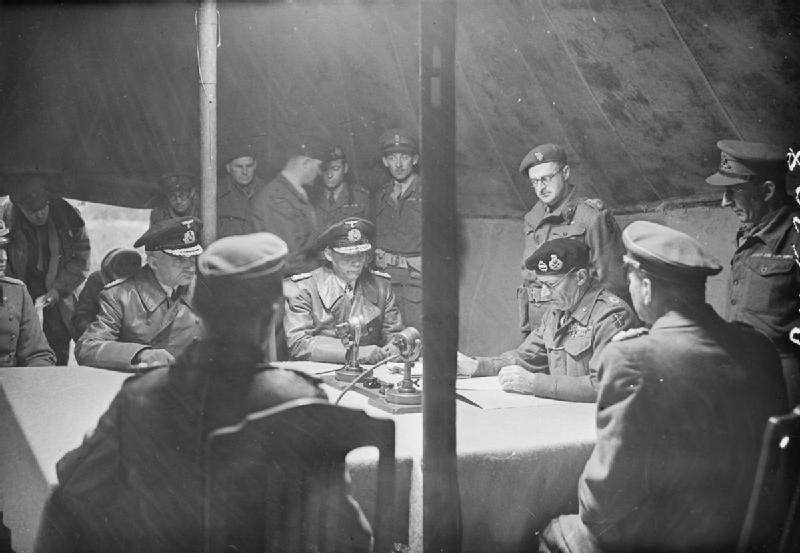
- Field Marshal Montgomery (seated second from the right) reading out the terms of the surrender to Rear Admiral Wagner and Admiral von Friedeburg
- Type: Capitulation
- Signed: 4 May 1945; 81 years ago
- Location: Lüneburg Heath, Germany
- Signatories: (United Kingdom) Bernard Montgomery; (Nazi Germany) Hans-Georg von Friedeburg; (Nazi Germany) Eberhard Kinzel; (Nazi Germany) Gerhard Wagner; (Nazi Germany) Fritz Poleck; (Nazi Germany) Hans Jochen Freidel
- Parties: United Kingdom; Germany

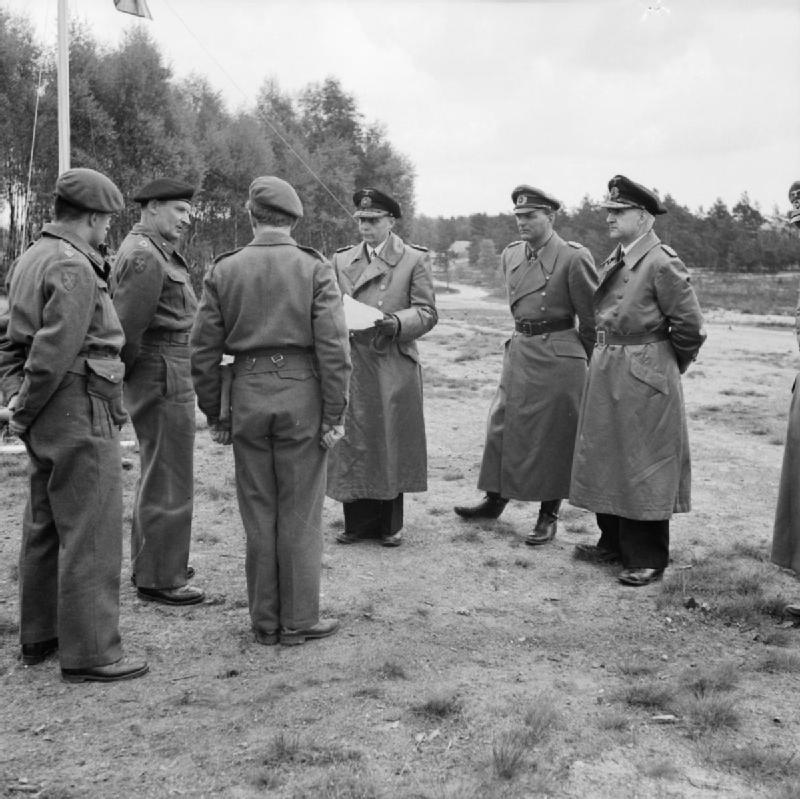
Field Marshal Montgomery (second from the left) with the German delegation (L to R – Admiral von Friedeburg, General Kinzel and Rear Admiral Wagner) on 3 May 1945

On 4 May 1945, at 18:30 British Double Summer Time, at Lüneburg Heath, south of Hamburg, British Field Marshal Sir Bernard Montgomery accepted the unconditional surrender of the German forces in the Netherlands, northwest Germany including all islands, in Denmark and all naval ships in those areas. The surrender preceded the end of World War II in Europe and was signed in a carpeted tent at Montgomery's headquarters on the Timeloberg hill at Wendisch Evern.

== The surrender negotiations and signing ceremony ==
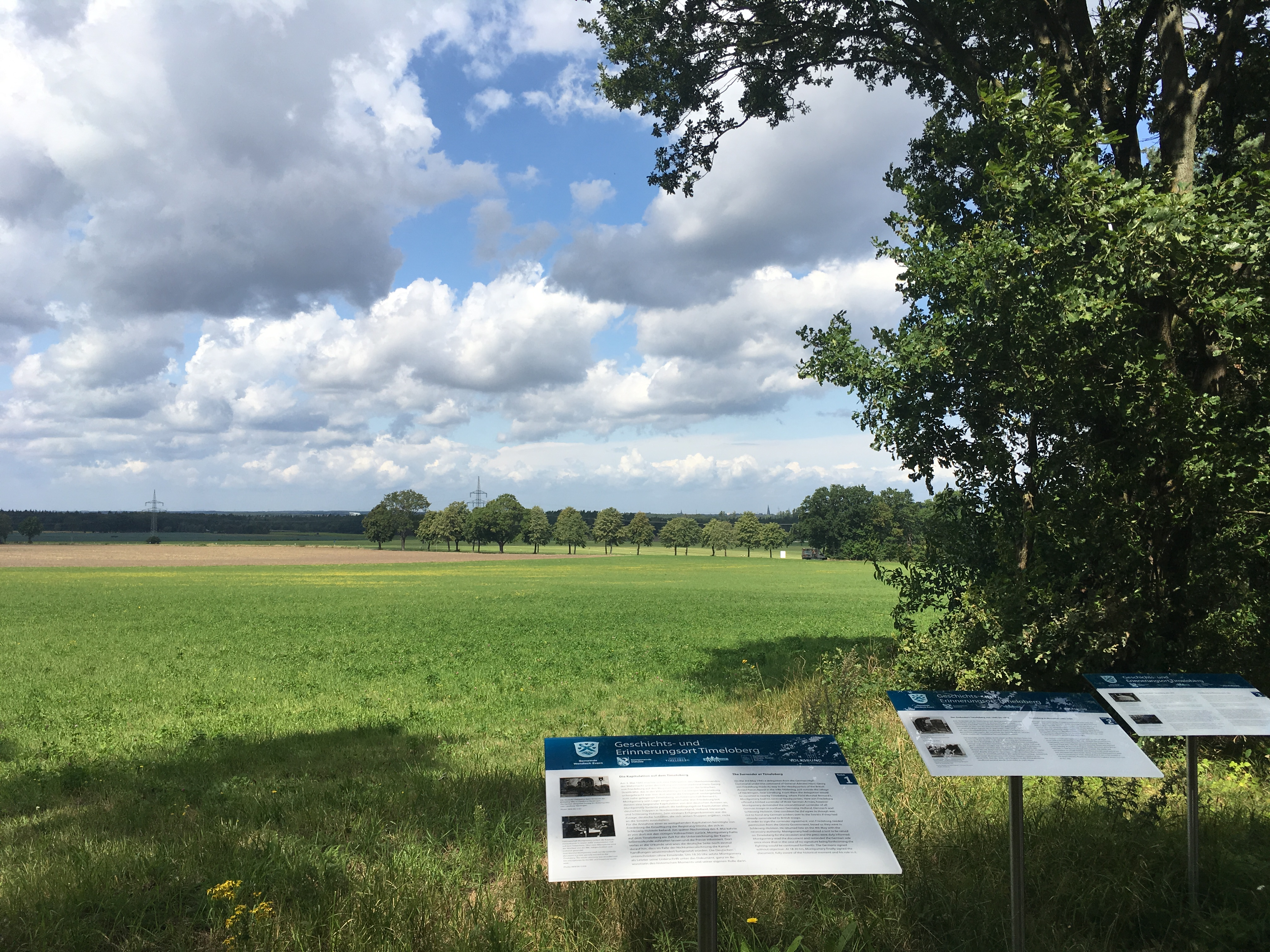
Timeloberg, Wendisch Evern. On the horizon, the church towers of Lüneburg can be seen – one of the reasons why the Allies had chosen the Timeloberg hill as a place of surrender: the surrender should be signed with a view of a defeated German city.

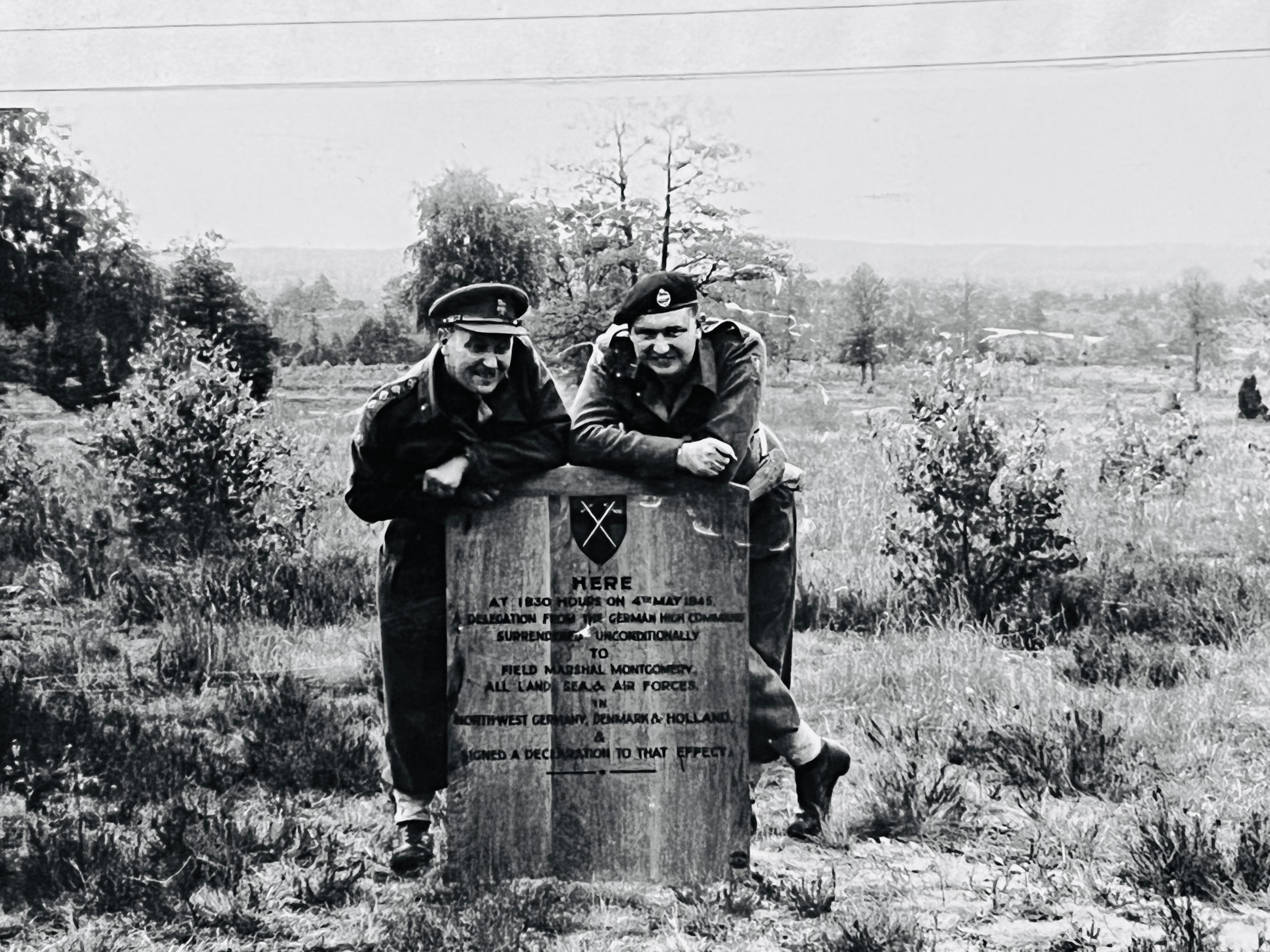
Memorial inscribed: "HERE – AT 18.30 HOURS on the 4th of May 1945 A Delegation from the German High Command Surrendered Unconditionally to Field Marshal Montgomery"

Lüneburg had been captured by the British forces on 18 April 1945 with Montgomery establishing his headquarters at a villa in the village of Häcklingen. A German delegation arrived at his tactical headquarters on the Timeloberg hill by car on 3 May, having been sent by Großadmiral Karl Dönitz who had been nominated President and Supreme Commander of the German armed forces by Adolf Hitler in his last will and testament on 29 April. Dönitz was aware of the allied occupation zones intended for Germany from a plan that had fallen into German hands. He therefore hoped that protracted partial and local surrender negotiations might buy time for troops and refugees in the east to seek refuge from the Red Army, whilst holding open a pocket to provide sanctuary on the west bank of the River Elbe.

Dönitz did not think it appropriate to negotiate personally with a field marshal as he had become the head of state following the death of Adolf Hitler. He therefore sent the delegation headed by the new Commander-in-Chief of the German navy Admiral Hans-Georg von Friedeburg. Montgomery refused an initial offer to surrender Army Group Vistula which was being cut off to the east by the Red Army and demanded the unconditional surrender of all forces on his northern and western flanks. The Germans stated that they did not have the authority to accept Montgomery's terms. However they agreed to return to their headquarters to obtain permission from Dönitz.

The German officers returned the next day at 18:00 with an additional delegate, (Colonel Fritz Poleck) representing the Oberkommando der Wehrmacht (the German armed forces high command). Von Friedeburg was ushered into Montgomery's command caravan for confirmation that they were ready to sign. For the surrender ceremony Montgomery sat at the head of a table with an army blanket draped over it and two BBC microphones in front of him; he called on each delegate in turn to sign the instrument of surrender document at 18.30. The surrender ceremony was filmed by the British Pathé News and recorded for broadcast on radio by the BBC with a commentary by the Australian war correspondent Chester Wilmot. The intimate detail of document translation and conversation interpretation was supervised by one of Montgomery's senior intelligence officers Colonel James Oliver Ewart.

In a report reprinted in The New York Times, CBS war correspondent Bill Downs described the surrender negotiations:

After lunch, Field Marshal Montgomery called the Germans back for further consultation, and there he delivered his ultimatum ... He told the Germans: "You must understand three things: Firstly, you must surrender to me unconditionally all the German forces in Holland, Friesen and the Frisian Islands and Heligoland and all other islands in Schleswig-Holstein and in Denmark. Secondly, when you have done that, I am prepared to discuss with you the implications of your surrender: how we will dispose of those surrendered troops, how we will occupy the surrendered territory, how we will deal with the civilians, and so forth. And my third point: If you do not agree to Point 1, the surrender, then I will go on with the war and I will be delighted to do so." Monty added, as an after-thought, "All your soldiers and civilians may be killed."

== The Instrument of Surrender ==
1. The German Command agrees to the surrender of all German armed forces in HOLLAND, in northwest GERMANY including the FRISIAN ISLANDS and HELIGOLAND and all other islands. In SCHLESWIG-HOLSTEIN and in DENMARK, to the C-in-C. 21 Army Group. This is to include all naval ships in the areas. These forces to lay down their arms and to surrender unconditionally.
2. All hostilities on land, on sea, or in the air by German forces in the above areas to cease at 0800hrs. British Double Summer Time on Saturday 5 May 1945.
3. The German command to carry out at once, and without argument or comment, all further orders that will be issued by the Allied Powers on any subject.
4. Disobedience of orders, or failure to comply with them, will be regarded as a breach of these surrender terms and will be dealt with by the Allied Powers in accordance with the accepted laws and usages of war.
5. This instrument of surrender is independent of, without prejudice to, and will be superseded by any general instrument of surrender imposed by or on behalf of the Allied Powers and applicable to Germany and the German armed forces as a whole.
6. This instrument of surrender is written in English and in German. [The] English version is the authentic text.
7. The decision of the Allied Powers will be final if any doubt or dispute arises as to the meaning or interpretation of the surrender terms.

== Signatories ==
- United Kingdom:
  - Field Marshal Bernard Montgomery – as commander of the 21st Army Group
- Germany:
  - Admiral Hans-Georg von Friedeburg – as German Commander-in-Chief of the Navy (Kriegsmarine).
  - General Eberhard Kinzel – as chief of staff of Army Group Weichsel (Vistula).
  - Rear Admiral Gerhard Wagner – as head of the operational department of the Kriegsmarine staff.
  - Colonel Fritz Poleck – Oberkommando der Wehrmacht representative (Wehrmacht).
  - Major Hans Jochen Friedel – staff officer to General Kinzel (Heer).

== Aftermath ==
Admiral von Friedeburg went on to sign the German Instrument of Surrender preparatory to the ending of World War II in Europe on 7 May at Reims in France and signed again on 8 May with the Supreme High Command of the Red Army, French and US representatives in Berlin. Both Admiral von Friedeburg and General Kinzel committed suicide in the weeks following the surrender; von Friedeburg on 23 May 1945, and Kinzel on 25 June 1945. After the war a monument was erected by the British on what they now called Victory Hill. The monument was dismantled in 1958 and rebuilt at the Royal Military Academy Sandhurst. Today the spot lies in an out-of-bounds military area and is not accessible to the public. In 1995 another monument was erected on the edge of the Timeloberg, outside the restricted area. The last survivor of the negotiations was one of Montgomery's interpreters Derek Knee who died aged 91 in 2014.

Memorial stone erected on May 4, 1995 on the edge of the Timeloberg to commemorate the signing of the surrender on May 4, 1945. Placed outside the training area near Wendisch Evern

== See also ==
- Debellatio
- End of World War II in Europe
- German Instrument of Surrender
