= Gerhard Wagner (admiral) =

German naval officer

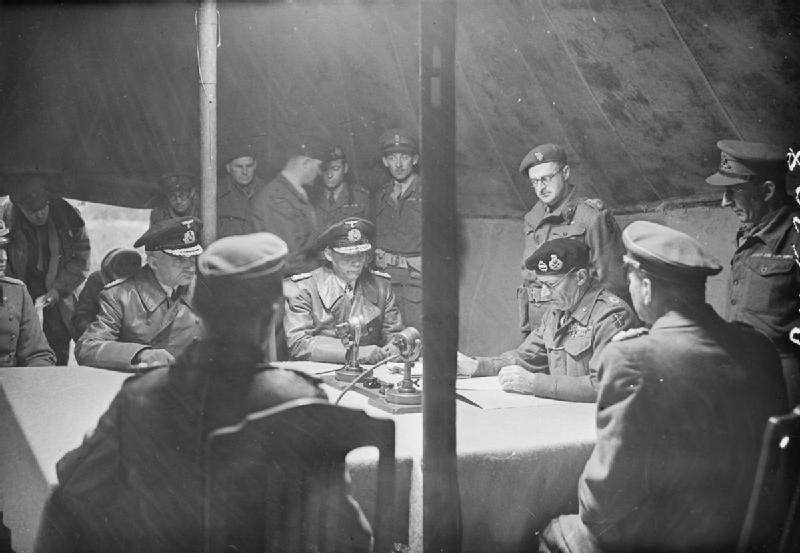
- Wagner (facing camera, left) as German forces surrender to Field Marshal Bernard Montgomery, 4 May 1945
- Born: 23 November 1898; Schwerin, Germany
- Died: 26 June 1987 (aged 88); Altenkirchen, West Germany
- Military career
- Allegiance: German Empire; Weimar Republic; Nazi Germany; West Germany (from 1955)
- Branch: Kriegsmarine German Navy
- Rank: Konteradmiral
- Commands: COMNAVBALTAP (1961–1962)
- Conflicts: World War II

Gerhard Wagner (23 November 1898 – 26 June 1987) was a German naval officer who ended his career as a Konteradmiral (rear admiral) of the German Navy of West Germany.

== Early life ==
Wagner was born in Schwerin on 23 November 1898 and joined the Imperial German Navy on 4 July 1916.

== World War II ==
At the beginning of the Second World War, Wagner was Naval Attaché in Madrid, Spain. The "Wagner Campaign" was named after him, via which from January to August 1940, 300 tons of strategic commodities, mainly tungsten, were exported from Spain to Germany for war materials use. The transaction was accounted for with deliveries of German arms, mercenary services and transports to Spain. Still, after 1 September 1939, the outbreak of World War II, aeroplane parts were delivered to Spain. The German exports to Spain, which had increased during the Spanish Civil War, were mainly carried out by sea. With the outbreak of World War 2, the Allies tried to block this sea route trade, and "the Wagner campaign" was devised to organize German merchant ships that were stuck after that in Spanish ports changing their flags and partially subscribing them to Spanish entrepreneurs Juan March.

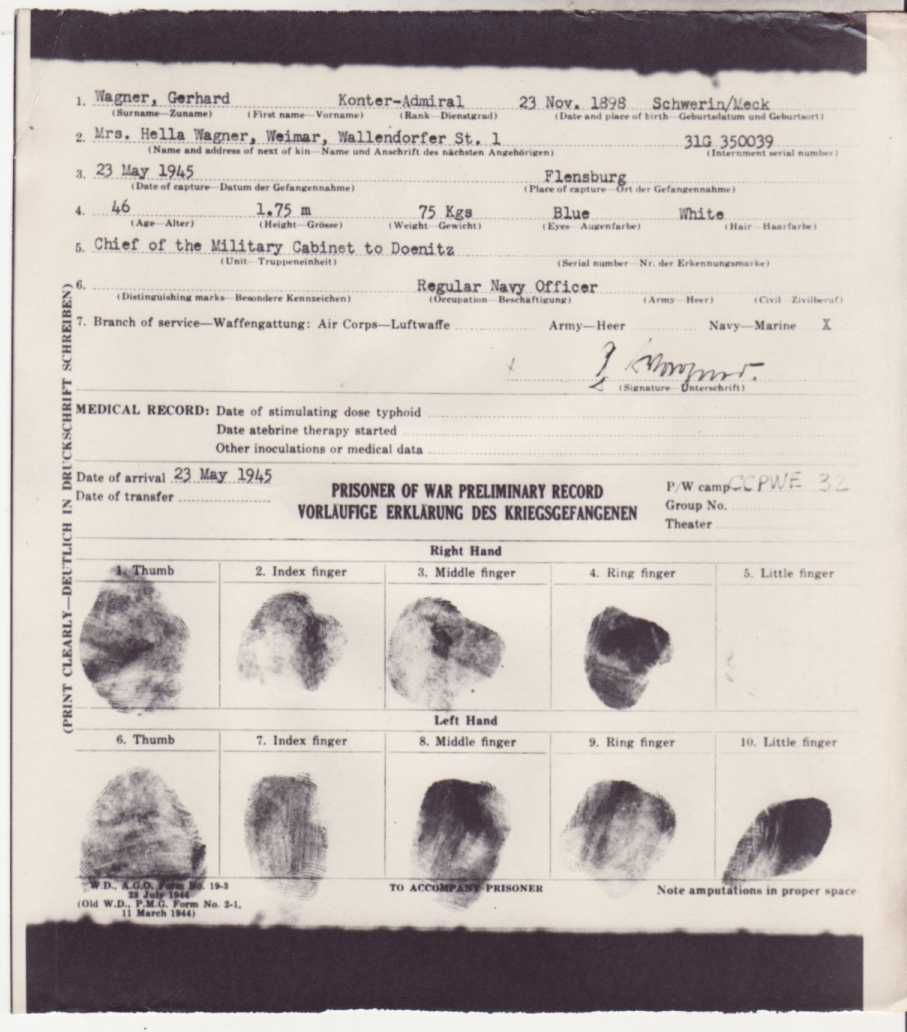
Wagner's POW record, and his fingerprints

During World War 2, Wagner became head of the Operational Department of the naval staff. At the end of the conflict, Wagner, together with the supreme commander of the Kriegsmarine, Hans Georg von Friedeburg, was present and a signatory to the surrender of the German forces in northern Germany at Lüneburg Heath on 4 May 1945 to the British Commander-in-Chief, General Bernard Montgomery.

Wagner subsequently gave testimony on 13 and 14 May 1946 at the Nuremberg Trials.

== Post-war activities ==
Wagner was a member of the "Naval Historical Team" based in Bremerhaven, which consisted of a group of German Naval officers appointed by the United States Navy to write down the war experiences of German naval forces from a German point of view in the conflict. The group produced a report in 1949 entitled Soviet anti-submarine warfare Potential (A historical summary of Soviet anti-submarine Warfare (ASW) operations during World War II), detailing missions of the German U-boats U-9, U-18, U-19, U-20, U-23, U-24, U-576, U-752, U-986, and U-997 in the years from 1942 to 1945.

In 1951 via the Naval Historical Team Wagner authored a paper entitled "A Critique on Vice-Admiral Eberhard Weichold's essay on 'German surface ships—policy and operations in World War II'(promulgated in ONI GHS / 4)".

Two papers known as 'Bremerhaven or Wagner memoranda' were also produced by the Group on the creation of a new post-war German Navy: "Aufbau eines deutschen Marinekontingents im Rahmen deutscher Mitwirkung an der Verteidigung Westeuropas [Establishment of a German naval contingent in the frame of a German involvement in the defence of Western Europe]", the so-called Wagner's memorandum, dated March 1951, and "Ausführungen des deutschen Marinesachverständigen, Konteradmiral a.D. Gerhard Wagner über Fragen des deutschen Marinebeitrages [Explanations by German naval expert Rear Admiral (ret.) Gerhard Wagner on questions of the German naval contribution]", 8 February 1952.

== German Federal Navy career ==
In the post-war Navy of West Germany, Wagner was appointed to the post of Deputy to the Navy Inspector (Friedrich Ruge). He was the first flag officer to hold the position of the integrated North Atlantic Treaty Organization Commander Naval Forces Baltic Approaches from 1961 to 1962, which was initially titled 'Commander Allied Naval Forces Northern Area Central Europe'. In this post, he held the temporary rank of Vice-Admiral.

== Death ==
He died in Altenkirchen on 26 June 1987 at the age of 88 years.

Military offices
New title	Deputy Inspector of the Navy; June 1957 – Mai 1961	Succeeded by Flottillenadmiral Alfred Schumann
