= Becklingen =

- Ortsteil of Bergen
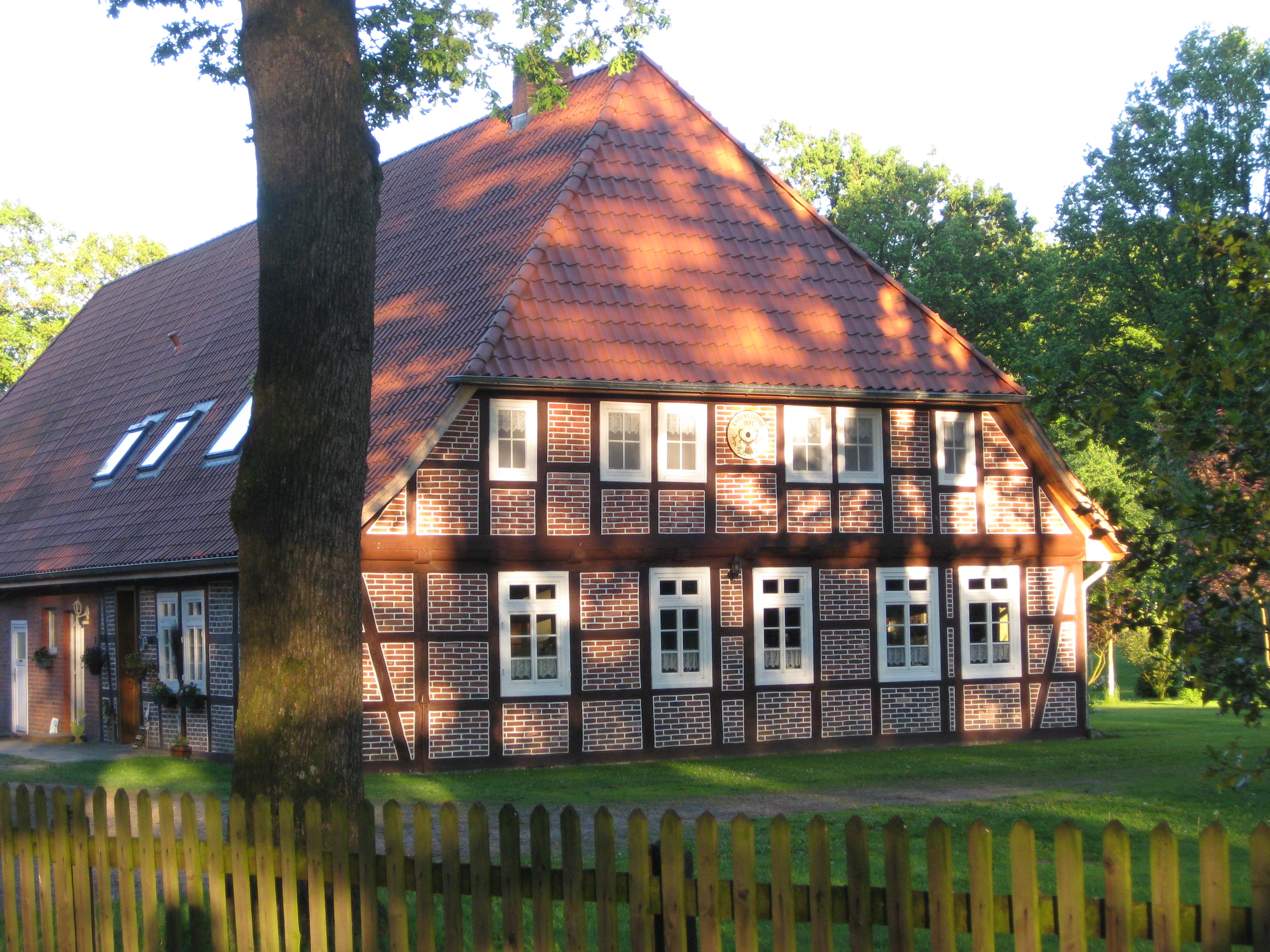
- Timber-framed farmhouse in Becklingen
- Interactive map of Becklingen
- Location within Germany Location within Lower Saxony
- Coordinates: 52°52′01″N 09°54′17″E
- Country: Germany
- State: Lower Saxony
- District: Celle
- Town: Bergen

Population (2019)
  - Total: 370
- Time zone: UTC+01:00 (CET)
  - Summer (DST): UTC+02:00 (CEST)
- Postal codes: 29303
- Dialling codes: 05051

Becklingen (German pronunciation: [ˈbɛklɪŋən]) is a German village in the Lower Saxon borough of Bergen in the northern part of Celle district on the Lüneburg Heath. Formerly an independent municipality, it is part of the town Bergen since 1971.

== Geography ==
Becklingen lies about 7 kilometres (4.3 mi) north of Bergen just off the B 3 federal highway and has 382 inhabitants (as at: 31 December 2000). Its parish includes the villages of Becklingen, Oehus and Tannensieksberg. There is also a hamlet known as Becklingen (Bhf) which has grown up around the old station about a mile from the main village. Bhf is the German abbreviation for Bahnhof or 'railway station'.

== Population ==
=== Growth ===
The following table shows the growth in population of Becklingen. There was a significant increase in numbers after the Second World War which was mainly due to the influx of refugees.

Historical population
Year	Pop.	±% p.a.
1820	106	—
1848	180	+1.91%
1925	234	+0.34%
1939	231	−0.09%
1945	500	+13.73%
1961	305	−3.04%
1970	349	+1.51%
2000	382	+0.30%
2015	362	−0.36%

=== Language ===
Becklingen belongs to the Low German language area and the Northern Low Saxon dialect group. Since the end of the Second World War, however, High German has largely superseded it. However, Low German continues to be used colloquially especially amongst the older members of the village.

== History ==
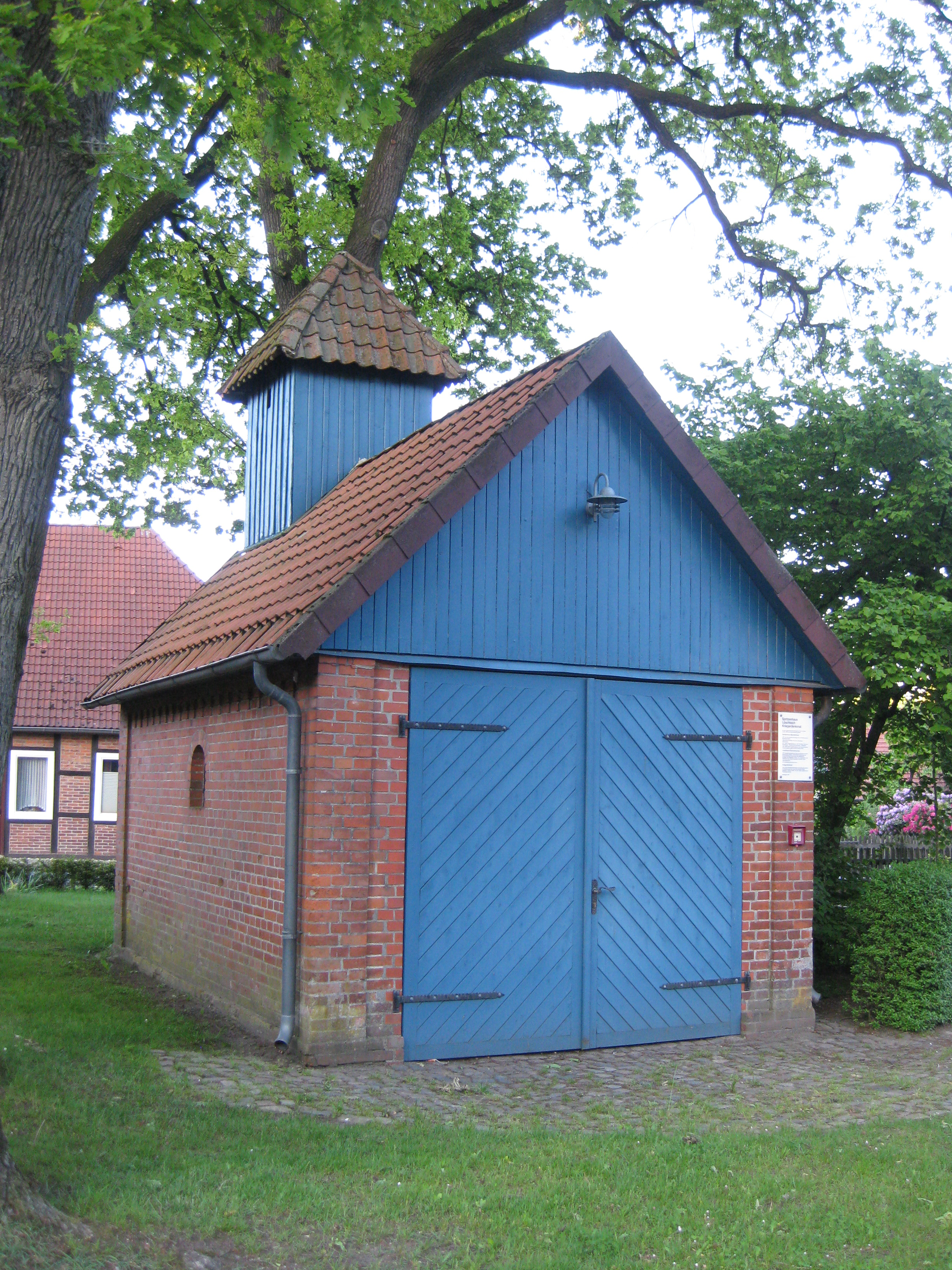
The old fire engine house in Becklingen

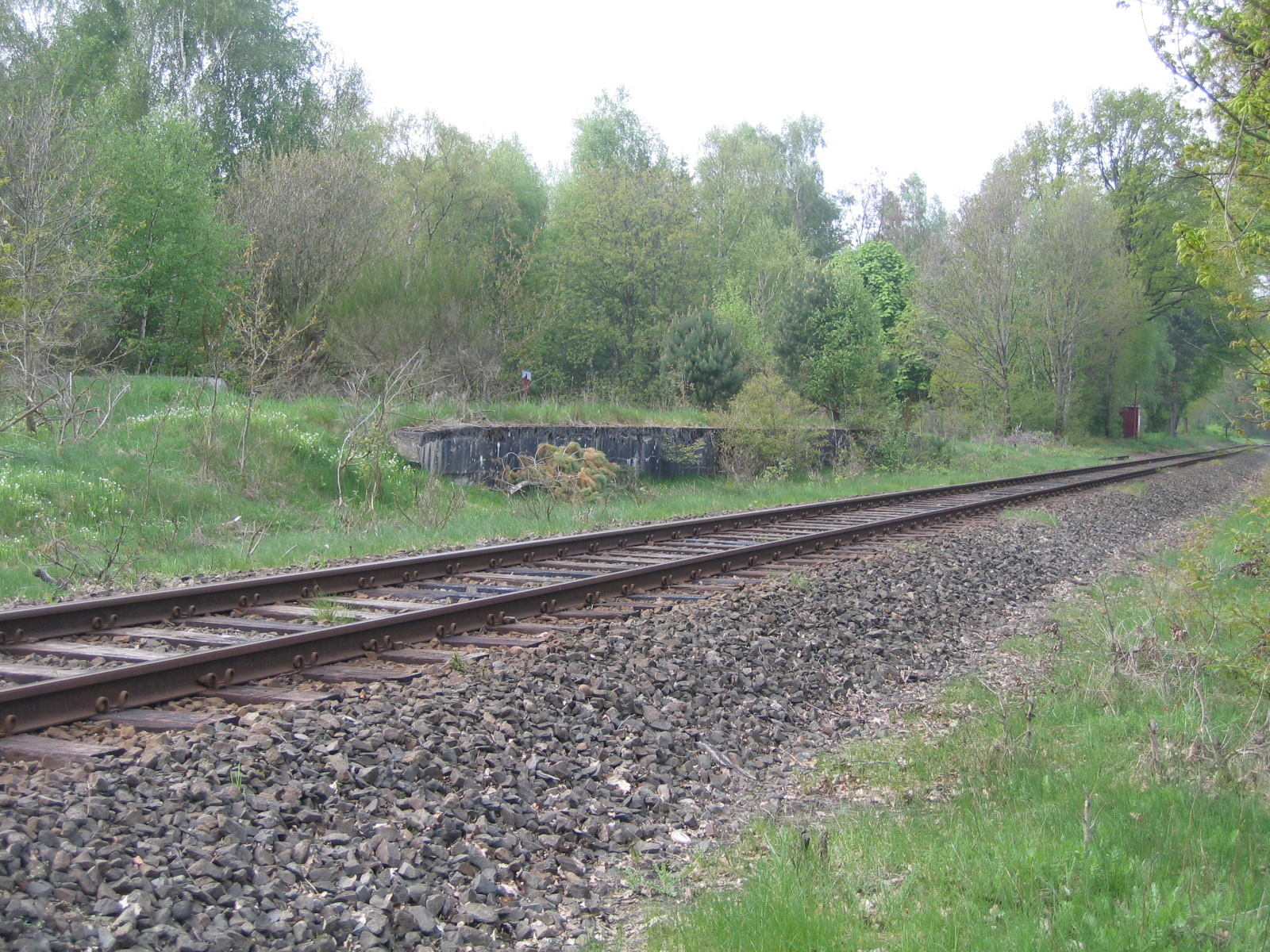
The old loading platform at Becklingen station

Becklingen was first mentioned in AD 1231 under the name Bekelinge.

The 19th century was characterised by extensive agricultural reforms. Fundamental to subsequent reforms was the general division (Generalteilung) of land at the beginning of the 19th century, whereby the villages were given fixed boundaries and every piece of land was allocated to a municipality (Gemeinde). The amount of land around the individual villages which was allocated to them was based on the grazing rights they had held in the past.

This was followed during the period 1838 to 1858 by the division of common land (Gemeinheitsteilungen). Common land, i.e. those areas which had hitherto been shared by the community, was now transferred to the individual farms as freehold property based on their existing rights to the common land.

On the basis of the Kingdom of Hanover's 1833 redemption law the obligations on farms under the manorial system were repealed. Farms to which the so-called manorial rights applied had been hitherto obliged to give numerous services and make frequent payments to the manor. That was now repealed on payment of 25 times the annual dues and the land was then granted under freehold into the farmers' ownership.

On 13 January 1872, west of Becklingen in the forest known as Becklinger Holz, which is nowadays within the Bergen-Hohne Training Area, the last wolf seen on the Lüneburg Heath in over a century was shot. The man who shot it was a forester, Grünewald, who was the Leibjäger to King George V of Hanover, the last king of Hanover. Since 2012, wolves have returned to the Heath having migrated from Eastern Europe.

In 1951 Becklingen War Cemetery was established near the village.

== Politics and administration ==
From the 14th century Bergen was recorded as having a vogtei's office, the lowest level of administration and justice, which was presided over by a ducal vogt. Matters of importance that only affected Becklingen were discussed and decided by the Realgemeinde, i.e. the farm owners who had common land rights. The political reforms of the 19th century brought about a fundamental change from which the political municipality of Sülze arose. Participation in the resolution of village affairs was no longer dependent on ownership of property or land; instead every male villager over 25 had the right to vote.

Since the merging of local councils as part of the Lower Saxon administrative reforms of 1971, Becklingen has been part of the town of Bergen. Becklingen is represented by a parish council (Ortsrat) and a chairman (Ortsbürgermeister). The council is empowered, inter alia, to make decisions about public services in the village, is responsible for maintaining the appearance of the village and for overseeing its clubs and societies, and has to be consulted by the town of Bergen on all important matters affecting the village. It consists of five elected representatives who, together with the chairman, sit on the Bergen borough council. The parish council elects its own chair. The current incumbent is Wilhelm Hohls.

== Literature ==
- Günther Ebel (Hrsg.), Die Geschichte der Feuerwehr in Becklingen, Becklingen, 1984
