= Wilhelm Oxenius =

German Wehrmacht officer during WW II (1912–1979)

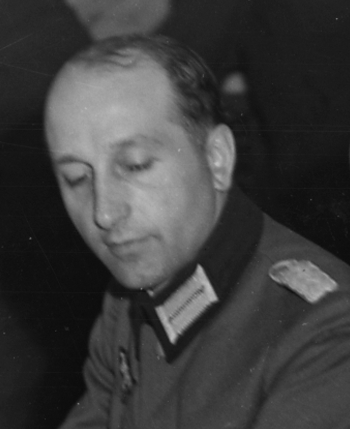
- Oxenius at the signing the German Instrument of Surrender at Reims, France 7 May 1945
- Born: 9 September 1912; Kassel
- Died: 13 August 1979 (aged 66); West Germany
- Military career
- Allegiance: Germany
- Branch: German Army
- Service years: 1937–1945
- Rank: Major
- Conflicts: World War II
- Awards: Iron Cross 1st Class; Iron Cross 2nd Class; Infantry Assault Badge in Silver

Major Wilhelm Oxenius (9 September 1912 – 13 August 1979) was a German Wehrmacht officer during World War II.

Oxenius served as an aide to Colonel General Alfred Jodl during World War II as a staff officer at the Operations Directorate of the Oberkommando der Wehrmacht. He was also an Operations Officer for Panzergruppe West in France in June 1944.

Oxenius is notable for being a member and translator of the delegation that signed the German unconditional surrender at Reims on 7 May 1945 with Colonel General Jodl and General Admiral Hans-Georg von Friedeburg.

He was a prisoner of war from 10 May 1945 to 3 January 1948 and died aged 66.

== See also ==
- German Instrument of Surrender
