= Derek Knee =

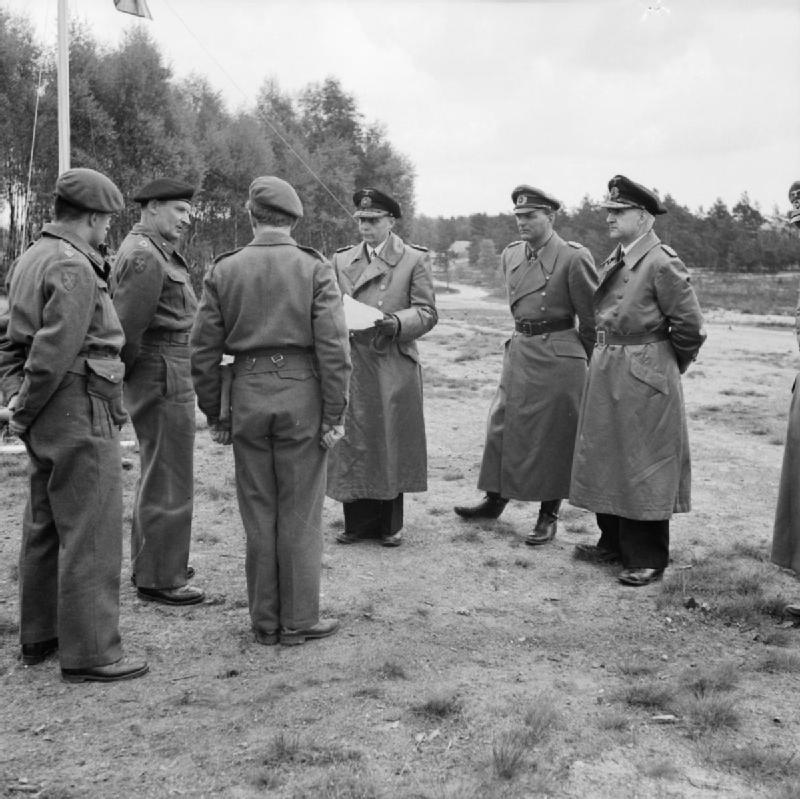
- Captain Derek Knee (third from left) at the arrival of the delegation for the German surrender at Lüneburg Heath, 3 May 1945
- Born: 22 October 1922; Cheltenham, Gloucestershire, England
- Died: 18 March 2014 (aged 91)
- Military career
- Allegiance: United Kingdom
- Branch: British Army
- Rank: Captain
- Unit: Dorsetshire Regiment
- Conflicts: World War II

Captain Derek Knee (22 October 1922 – 18 March 2014) was an intelligence officer of the British Army during World War II. He was the interpreter and translator for Field Marshal Bernard Montgomery, commander of the Anglo-Canadian 21st Army Group, at the German surrender at Lüneburg Heath in Germany on 3 May 1945.

== Early life and service in World War II ==
Knee attended Cheltenham Grammar School, where his father was the headmaster, and he spent a summer with a family in Germany which helped him to become fluent in the language. He then read Modern Languages at Christ's College, Cambridge for a year until he was commissioned as an officer in the Dorset Regiment. His language skills led to postings to a course on the interrogation of prisoners of war and to a censorship unit in London. After D-Day he served at Second Army Headquarters under General Miles Dempsey, identifying German units and estimating their strengths.

== German surrender ==
On 2 May 1945, Knee was told to report to Field Marshal Montgomery's 21st Army Group Tactical Headquarters on Lüneburg Heath the next day, where a German delegation arrived with a letter from Field Marshal Wilhelm Keitel which he translated for Montgomery. The delegation said they did not have authority to agree to the unconditional surrender terms stipulated by Montgomery; they were provided with a lunch with wine and brandy. The next day they returned with another delegate and signed the surrender document in a carpeted tent, witnessed by war correspondents. Knee was later directed to travel to Flensburg to take into custody Karl Dönitz – at that time Germany's head of state – and transport him to the airport. Upon his return to Lüneburg, he saw the body of Heinrich Himmler who had committed suicide in British custody.

== Later life ==
Upon his return to his studies at Cambridge University, Knee switched to an Economics course. He later became assistant general secretary at the International Association of Department Stores, in Paris and Geneva. Upon his retirement he moved to Barry, Vale of Glamorgan, Wales. He was married with two sons.

== See also ==
- German surrender at Lüneburg Heath
