= James Oliver Ewart =

British intelligence officer (1917–1945)

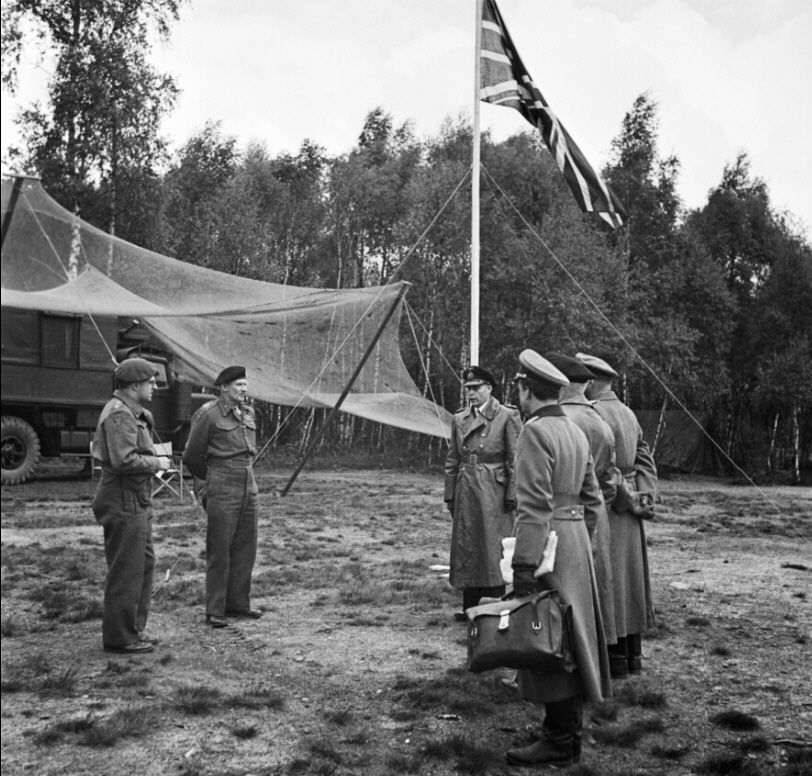
- Field Marshal Sir Bernard Montgomery speaking with a delegation of senior German officers at his Tac HQ on 4 May 1945. Colonel "Joe" Ewart is translating for his commander.
- Born: 3 April 1917; Taynuilt, Scotland
- Died: 1 July 1945 (aged 28); Melle, Germany
- Burial place: Munster Heath War Cemetery, Kreis Warendorf, Nordrhein-Westfalen, Germany
- Military career
- Allegiance: United Kingdom
- Branch: British Army
- Service years: 1940–1945
- Rank: Colonel
- Nickname: "Joe"
- Service number: 113332
- Units: Royal Scots; Intelligence Corps
- Conflicts: World War II
- Awards: Commander of the Order of the British Empire

Colonel James Oliver Ewart (3 April 1917 – 1 July 1945) was a British Army Intelligence officer who because of his language skills would be posted to a number of staff officer posts in Allied headquarters in Western Europe. He spent most of his active service career in the Mediterranean and European theatres of operation during the Second World War, where he frequently worked with Field Marshal Sir Bernard Montgomery.

== Biography ==
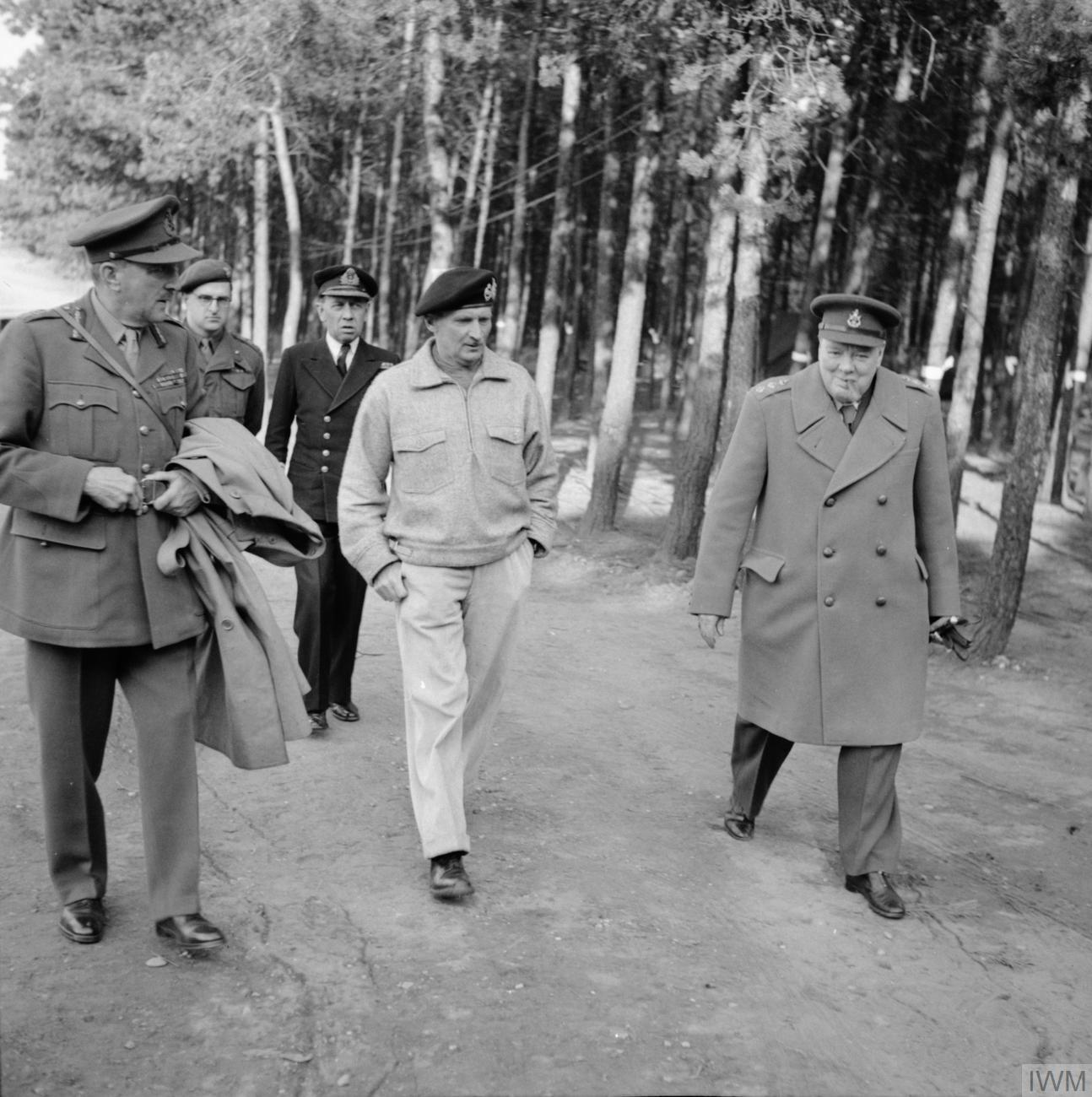
Winston Churchill with Field Marshal Sir Bernard Montgomery and Field Marshal Sir Alan Brooke during the Prime Minister's tour of troops taking part in the Rhine crossing, 25 March 1945. Between Brooke and Montgomery is Colonel James Oliver Ewart and an unknown Royal Navy officer.

Ewart's father and an uncle had both seen service in the First World War, his father (also James Oliver) having served in France and Belgium with the Royal Engineers where he was both Mentioned in dispatches and awarded the Military Cross (MC).

Ewart's family were Scottish and he spent many of his pre-war years living in Edinburgh. He was the only child of James Oliver and Flora Livingstone Ewart. He was educated in Edinburgh and attended George Watson's College and is recorded as being a very able student and sportsman. Having left school Ewart then went on to attend the University of Edinburgh and graduated with 1st Class Honours in Classics. However, it was his language skills that would prove vital in his war service after university; he could speak French, German, Dutch, Modern Greek, Spanish and Italian.

== Service career ==
Ewart was initially commissioned into the 7th/9th (Highlanders) Battalion Royal Scots (a mobilised Territorial infantry unit) on 13 January 1940; his service number was 113332. However, prior to his battalion's embarkation for France in June 1940 he was transferred to the War Office's Directorate of Military Intelligence. He would later transfer to the Intelligence Corps on 19 July 1940. He would finish his service as the second most senior intelligence staff officer in Field Marshal Montgomery's 21st Army Group during the liberation of Europe; and he would be one of the key staff at the surrender of German forces to Montgomery on 4 May 1945 on Lüneburg Heath. He was even captured on film standing next to his commander, as "Monty" reads out the terms of German surrender to an Allied film crew.

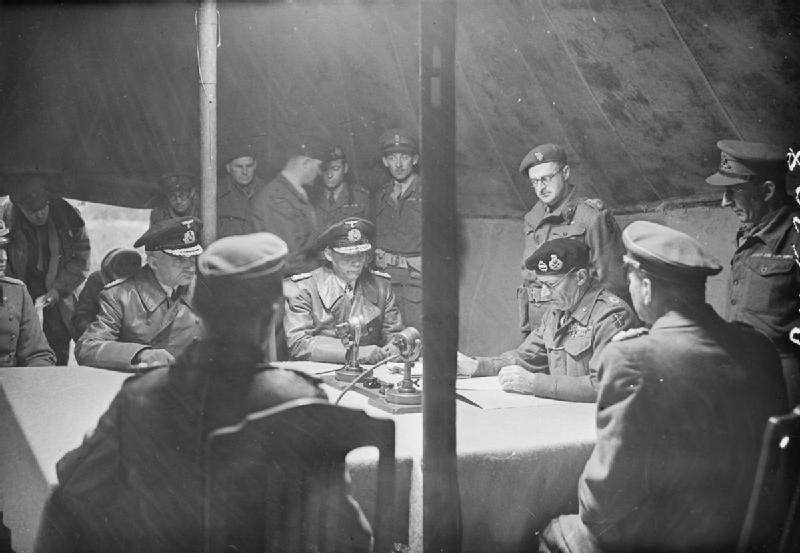
Field Marshal Montgomery (seated second from the right) reads the terms of the surrender of German forces in the North of the country, watched by Colonel Joe Ewart standing immediately behind him to the left (wearing a beret).

His qualities as a staff officer during sensitive negotiations were recognised by his commander and he was awarded the CBE on 21 June 1945, having earlier been awarded the OBE for his service in Sicily.

== Death and legacy ==
Ewart died on duty of injuries he received in a road traffic accident on 1 July 1945, near the town of Melle, Germany. He was buried at the Munster Heath War Cemetery, Kreis Warendorf, Nordrhein-Westfalen, Germany. He was survived by his wife (Margaret Armstrong Ewart) and his parents.

James Ewart Avenue, built on the former School of Service Intelligence site in Ashford, Kent, is named after him.
