= 337th Volksgrenadier Division =

- German: 337. Volksgrenadier-Division
- Divisional vehicle insignia
- Active: 1944/45
- Country: Nazi Germany
- Branch: Army
- Type: Infantry
- Size: Division

Commanders
- Notable commanders: Generalleutnant Eberhard Kinzel

The 337th Volksgrenadier Division (German: 337. Volksgrenadier-Division) was a German military unit formed during World War II.

== History ==
The 337th Volksgrenadier Division was formed on 15 September 1944, in Groß-Born as a replacement for the 337th Infantry Division, utilizing the newly formed 570th Volksgrenadier Division as its basis.

On 1 January, the 337th Volksgrenadier Division (then under 9th Army of Army Group A) had a strength of 10,386 men.

The division fought south of Warsaw as part of the 9th Army between October 1944 and January 1945, and against the East Prussian offensive as part of the 2nd Army in February 1945.

== Sources ==
=== Literature ===
- Tessin, Georg (1974). "Die Landstreitkräfte 281—370". Verbände und Truppen der deutschen Wehrmacht und Waffen SS im Zweiten Weltkrieg 1939—1945 (in German). Vol. 9. Osnabrück: Biblio. pp. 206–207.
