= Eberhard Kinzel =

German Wehrmacht General

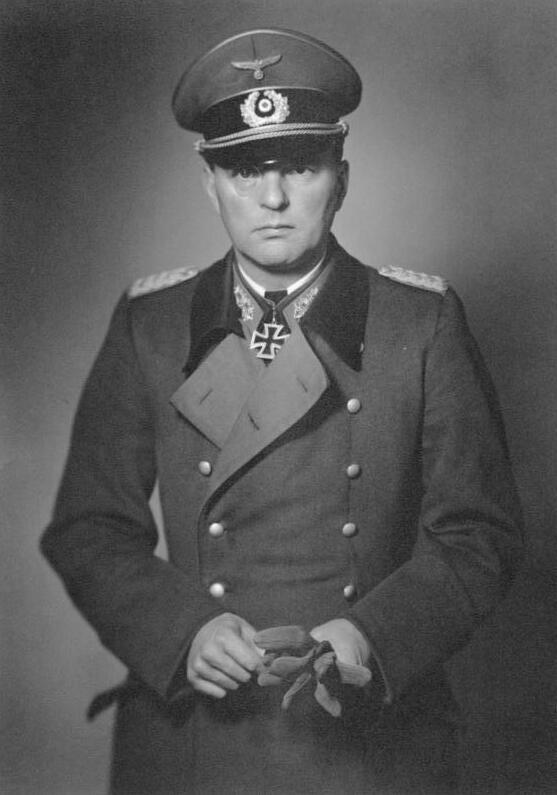
- Born: 18 October 1897; Berlin, Germany
- Died: 25 June 1945 (aged 47) near Idstedt, Germany
- Spouse: Erika von Aschoff (Partner)
- Military career
- Allegiance: German Empire (to 1918); Weimar Republic (to 1933); Nazi Germany
- Branch: German Army
- Rank: General of the Infantry
- Units: Army Group North; Army Group Vistula
- Commands: 570th Volksgrenadier Division; 337th Volksgrenadier Division
- Conflicts: World War II
- Awards: Knight's Cross of the Iron Cross

Eberhard Kinzel (18 October 1897 – 25 June 1945) was a general in the Wehrmacht of Nazi Germany during World War II who commanded several divisions. He was a recipient of the Knight's Cross of the Iron Cross.

== Military career ==
Kinzel was with section Fremde Heere Ost, FHO or Foreign Armies East, until the spring of 1942 when he was replaced by Reinhard Gehlen. The FHO prepared situation maps of the Soviet Union, Poland, Scandinavia and the Balkans; and assembled information on potential adversaries.

Kinzel was part of the delegation that participated in the negotiations for the German surrender with Field-Marshal Montgomery at Lüneburg Heath on 4 May 1945.

== Death ==
Kinzel, together with his girlfriend Erika von Aschoff, committed suicide on 25 June 1945.

== Personal life ==
Kinzel was the uncle of Günther Lützow.

== Awards and decorations ==
- Knight's Cross of the Iron Cross on 21 December 1942 as chief department GZ [Zentralabteilung—central department] with the chief of the Generalstab des Heeres [until November 1942 chief of the General Staff XXIX Armeekorps].

Military offices
Preceded by —	Leader of Foreign Armies East; 1 March 1939 – 31 March 1942	Succeeded by Oberstleutnant Reinhard Gehlen
Preceded by Generalleutnant Wilhelm Hasse	Chief of Staff of Heeresgruppe Nord; 22 January 1943 – 18 July 1944	Succeeded by Generalmajor Oldwig von Natzmer
Preceded by Brigadeführer Heinz Lammerding	Chief of Staff of Heeresgruppe Weichsel; 21 March 1945 – 22 April 1945	Succeeded by Generalmajor Ivo-Thilo von Trotha
