= 337th Infantry Division =

- German: 337. Infanterie-Division
- Country: Nazi Germany
- Branch: Army
- Type: Infantry
- Size: Division
- Engagements: World War II

The 337th Infantry Division (German: 337. Infanterie-Division) was a German Army infantry division in World War II. It was formed on 16 November 1940 in Kempten. The division was destroyed on the Eastern front in July 1944 and formed the staff and core personnel of Divisionsgruppe 337 on 7 August 1944 which later was the basis of the 337th Volksgrenadier-Division.

== Commanding officers ==
- Generalleutnant Karl Spang, 15 November 1940 – 2 May 1941
- Generalleutnant Kurt Pflieger, 19 May 1941 – 15 March 1942
- General der Artillerie Erich Marcks, 15 March 1942 – 20 September 1942
- Generalleutnant Otto Schünemann, 5 October 1942 – 27 December 1943
- Generalleutnant Walter Scheller, 27 December 1943 – July 1944
