= Wendisch Evern =

- Municipality
- Coat of arms

- Location of Wendisch Evern within Lüneburg district
- Interactive map of Wendisch Evern
- Location within Germany Location within Lower Saxony
- Coordinates: 53°13′N 10°28′E
- Country: Germany
- State: Lower Saxony
- District: Lüneburg
- Municipal assoc.: Ostheide
- Subdivisions: 5

Government
  - Mayor: Rudi Kiener (SPD)

Area
  - Total: 14.9 km^{2} (5.8 sq mi)
- Elevation: 59 m (194 ft)

Population (2025-12-31)
  - Total: 1,749
  - Density: 117/km^{2} (304/sq mi)
- Time zone: UTC+01:00 (CET)
  - Summer (DST): UTC+02:00 (CEST)
- Postal codes: 21403
- Dialling codes: 04131
- Vehicle registration: LG

Wendisch Evern is a municipality in the district of Lüneburg, in Lower Saxony, Germany.

== Recent history (Second World War) ==
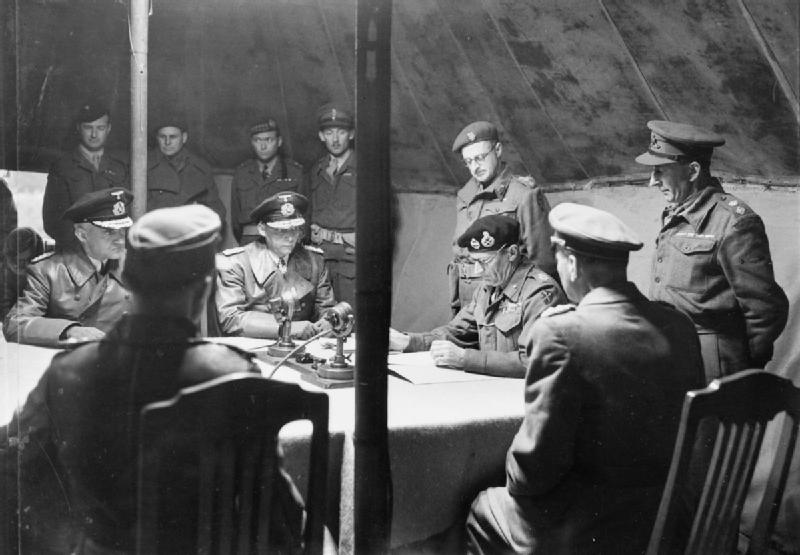
The German surrender is signed at the Timeloberg

On 4 May 1945 on the Timeloberg hill at the edge of Deutsch Evern a German delegation under the command of Hans-Georg von Friedeburg signed a document in the presence of British Field Marshal Bernard Montgomery for the unconditional surrender of the three German armies operating in Northwest Germany. This went into force on 5 May at 7 a.m. With the signing of the surrender agreement the Second World War in Northwest Germany came to an end. After the war a monument was erected by the British on what they now called Victory Hill. The monument was dismantled in 1958 and rebuilt at the Royal Military Academy Sandhurst. Today the spot lies in a military out-of-bounds area and is not accessible. In 1995 another monument was erected on the edge of the Timeloberg, outside the out-of-bounds area.

After Heinrich Himmler committed suicide in May 1945 his body was supposed to have been interred on the Wendisch-Evern Training Area at an unknown spot.
