= Hans-Georg von Friedeburg =

German navy officer, U-boat commander, Admiral in the Kriegsmarine (1895–1945)

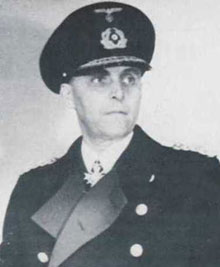
- Friedeburg in 1945

Commander of the Marine High Command
- In office 1 May 1945 – 23 May 1945
- Preceded by: Karl Dönitz
- Succeeded by: Walter Warzecha

Personal details
- Born: 15 July 1895 Straßburg, Alsace-Lorraine, German Empire
- Died: 23 May 1945 (aged 49) Flensburg, Schleswig-Holstein, Allied-occupied Germany
- Awards: Knight's Cross of the War Merit Cross
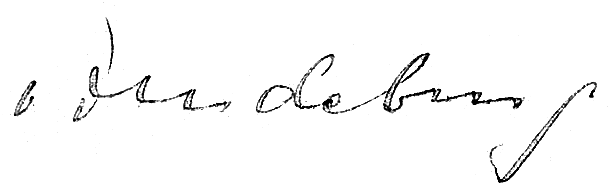
- Signature

Military service
- Allegiance: German Empire; Weimar Republic; Nazi Germany
- Branch/service: Imperial German Navy; Reichsmarine; Kriegsmarine
- Years of service: 1914–1945
- Rank: Generaladmiral
- Commands: Commander-in-Chief of the Kriegsmarine; U-27

Hans-Georg Friedrich Ludwig Robert von Friedeburg (15 July 1895 – 23 May 1945) was a German admiral, the deputy commander of the U-boat Forces of Nazi Germany and the second-to-last Commander-in-Chief of the Kriegsmarine. He was the only representative of the armed forces to be present at the signing of the German instruments of surrender in Luneburg Heath on 4 May 1945, in Reims on 7 May and in Berlin on 8 May 1945. Von Friedeburg committed suicide shortly afterwards, upon the dissolution of the Flensburg Government.

== Early life ==
Hans-Georg von Friedeburg was born in Strassburg in the German Imperial Territory of Alsace-Lorraine (Elsass-Lothringen), the son of Prussian officer Karl von Friedeburg (1862–1924).

== Military career ==
On 1 April 1914 he joined the Imperial Navy as a Seekadett. After the outbreak of World War I, von Friedeburg, promoted to the rank of Fähnrich zur See (Officer Aspirant) served on the dreadnought Kronprinz and took part in the 1916 Battle of Jutland against the British Royal Navy's Grand Fleet. Elevated to Leutnant zur See, he joined the U-boat forces as naval officer on SM U-114 from June to November 1918.

A prominent German naval officer of the post-war period, he was appointed Deputy Commander of the German U-boat fleet in September 1941. Overseeing German U-boat training and deployment of the U-boat bases in France, he later organised U-boat picket lines in the mid-Atlantic to find and attack Allied convoys. Promoted to rear admiral in 1942, von Friedeburg assumed command of the German U-boat fleet in February of the following year. He was awarded the Ritterkreuz des Kriegsverdienstkreuzes mit Schwertern on 17 January 1945. He succeeded Grand Admiral Karl Dönitz as Commander-in-Chief of the Kriegsmarine when Dönitz became Reich President upon Hitler's suicide (and per Hitler's last will), and was promoted to General admiral on 1 May 1945.

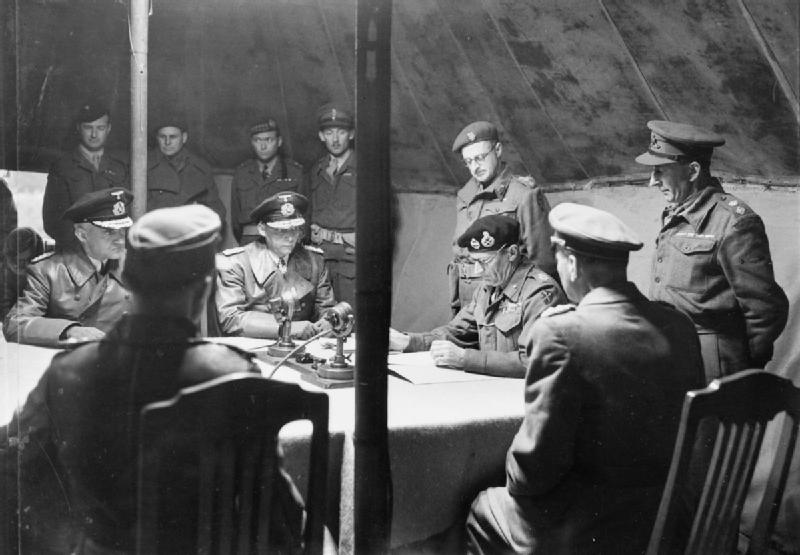
Montgomery (right) and von Friedeburg signing the German surrender at Lüneburg Heath, 4 May 1945

In early May 1945, von Friedeburg was ordered by Dönitz to negotiate the surrender to the Western Allied forces. Arriving at Field Marshal Bernard Montgomery's headquarters in Lüneburg, Germany he was informed that an unconditional surrender to all Allied forces was necessary and not negotiable. Upon receiving permission from Dönitz, he signed an instrument of surrender of all German armed forces in the Netherlands, northwest Germany and Denmark on 4 May 1945. On 7 May 1945, he was present at the first signing of the German Instrument of Surrender by General Alfred Jodl in Reims.

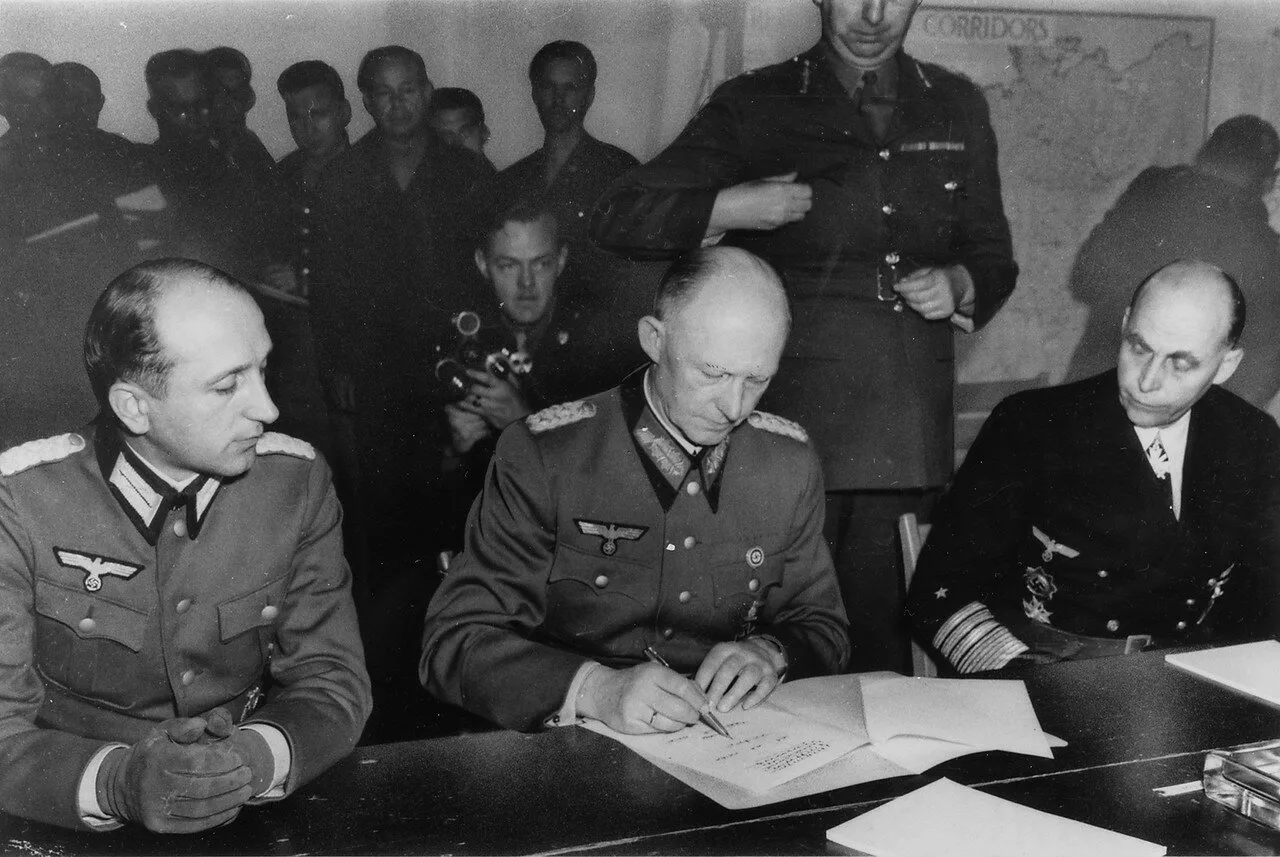
Friedeburg (right) witnessing the surrender being signed by Generaloberst Alfred Jodl with Major Wilhelm Oxenius to the left.

Von Friedeburg was in Berlin on 8 May 1945 for the second signing of the German Instrument of Surrender. He signed on behalf of the Kriegsmarine, along with Colonel General Hans-Jürgen Stumpff for the Luftwaffe and Generalfeldmarschall Wilhelm Keitel for the Heer and OKW. Marshal Georgy Zhukov and Air Chief Marshal Arthur William Tedder signed for the Soviet Union and SHAEF respectively.

== Death ==
On 23 May 1945, the same day that members of the Flensburg Government were arrested, von Friedeburg became a prisoner of war of the British Army in Plön, and committed suicide by swallowing poison. His body was buried at Adelby Cemetery near Flensburg.

== Personal life ==
His son Ludwig von Friedeburg (1924–2010) became a sociologist and later a politician, serving from 1969 and 1974 as Minister for Culture in the state of Hesse.

== Awards ==
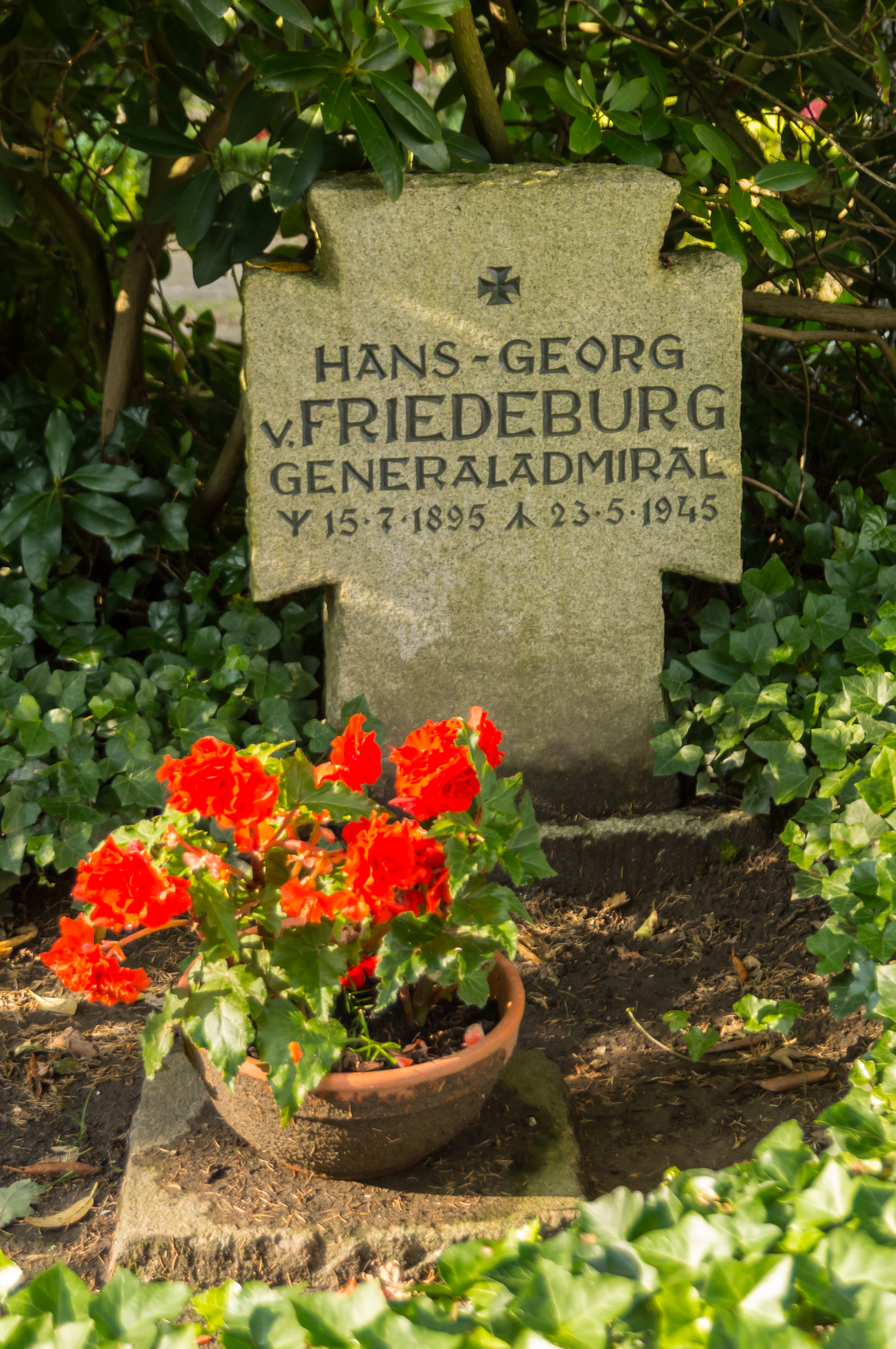
Friedeburg's grave next to that of Wolfgang Lüth

- Iron Cross (1914)
  - 2nd Class
  - 1st Class
- Knight's Cross Second Class of the Order of the Zähringer Lion with Swords
- Knight of the Order of St. John
- Cross of Honour
- Wehrmacht Long Service Award 4th to 1st Class
- Spanish Cross in Silver with Swords
- Clasp to the Iron Cross (1939)
  - 2nd Class
  - 1st Class
- War Merit Cross with Swords
  - 2nd Class
  - 1st Class
- German Cross in Silver on 6 June 1942 as Kapitän zur See and 2nd admiral of the U-boats
- Knight's Cross of the War Merit Cross (17 January 1945)
