= Critchfield =

Critchfield is a surname. Notable people with the surname include:

- Charles Critchfield (1910–1994), American mathematical physicist at the Los Alamos National Laboratory
- Jack Critchfield (born 1933), Florida Progress Corporation Chairman
- James H. Critchfield (1917–2003), American CIA officer
- Larry Critchfield (1908–1965), NFL player
- Richard Critchfield, American essayist and MacArthur fellow
- Russ Critchfield (born 1946), American former basketball player

== See also ==
- Critchfield, Indiana, unincorporated community in White River Township, Johnson County, Indiana
- Jack Critchfield Park, stadium in Slippery Rock, Pennsylvania
