= Bodelschwingh =

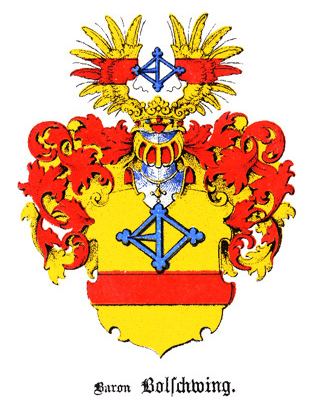
Coat of arms of the Bodelschwingh family

The Bodelschwingh family was an old German noble family, originally from Westphalia, Germany. The family's first written document dates back to the 13th century. Since 1862 members of the family held the title of Baron in the Russian Empire, while from 1896 they held the title of Freiherr in Austria.

== Notable members ==
- Ernst von Bodelschwingh (1906–1993), German politician
- Ernst von Bodelschwingh-Velmede (1794–1854), Prussian statesman and Minister of the Interior
- Karl von Bodelschwingh-Velmede (1800–1873), Prussian politician (brother of Ernst)
- Friedrich von Bodelschwingh, Senior (1831–1910), German theologian and founder of charitable public-health institutions (son of Ernst)
- Friedrich von Bodelschwingh, Junior (1877–1946), German theologian and public-health advocate (son of Friedrich, Senior)
- Otto von Bolschwing (1909-1982), German-American Schutzstaffel officer, intelligence agent and international businessman.

== See also ==
- Bodelschwingh (family)
- v. Bodelschwinghsche Anstalten Bethel, a charitable public-health institution in Bielefeld founded and led by Friedrich von Bodelschwingh, Senior, and later his son Bodelschwingh, Junior
- Otto von Bolschwing (1909 – 1982)
- 152559 Bodelschwingh, an asteroid
