= Otto von Bolschwing =

Officer in SS Sicherheitsdienst; CIA operative (1909–1982)

- Born: 15 October 1909; Schönbruch, East Prussia, German Empire
- Died: 7 March 1982 (aged 72); Carmichael, California, U.S.
- Military career
- Allegiance: Nazi Germany (1933—1945); Austria (1945); West Germany (1947—1950); United States (1950—1954)
- Branch: Allgemeine-SS
- Service years: December 1939 — February 1945
- Rank: SS-Hauptsturmführer
- Nicknames: "Ossie" "Unrest"; Captain Albert D. Eisner
- Units: Sicherheitsdienst (Austria) Austrian Resistance (Germany) Gehlen Organization; Central Intelligence Agency
- Conflicts: World War II; Cold War

Otto Albrecht Alfred von Bolschwing (15 October 1909 – 7 March 1982) was a German SS-Hauptsturmführer, intelligence officer and international businessman. During the Nazi-era and World War II, he served as an operative of the Sicherheitsdienst (SD) in Mandatory Palestine, Greece, the Netherlands and Romania, where he was involved in instigating the Legionnaires' Rebellion and the Bucharest Pogrom in 1941. Von Bolschwing also worked as a consultant to the Office of Jewish Affairs (Judenreferat) from 1937—39. He specialized in the expropriation of Jewish property and also served as an advisor to Adolf Eichmann. In 1945, he abandoned his prior allegiance to Nazi Germany and joined the Austrian Resistance.

During the early years of the Cold War, von Bolschwing continued to work as an intelligence agent in Central and Southeastern Europe, first for the Gehlen Organization and later for the CIA. With the complicity of the U.S. government, von Bolschwing emigrated to the United States in 1954, where he embarked on a successful career as a corporate executive and eventually obtained U.S. citizenship in 1959. His prior Nazi Party affiliations and suspected involvement in war crimes were later uncovered by the U.S. Justice Department and he was forced to surrender his American citizenship in 1981.

== Early life and Nazi career ==
=== Early life & business ventures ===
Otto Albrecht Alfred von Bolschwing was born in Schönbruch, District of Bartenstein, East Prussia, German Empire (now: Szczurkowo, Poland) on 15 October 1909. He was the youngest of five children and was descended from the Junker nobility via the untitled Bodelschwingh family on the paternal side and the baronial Hollen family on the maternal side. His father, the Prussian aristocrat Richard Otto Wilhelm Ferdinand von Bolschwing, served as a cavalry officer (Rittmeister) in the Imperial German Army during World War I and was killed in action on the Eastern Front in October 1914.

After the war, von Bolschwing attended Hauptschule in Königsberg (now: Kaliningrad, Russia), completing his final examinations in 1926. He went on to study law and economics at the Silesian Friedrich-Wilhelm University of Breslau and the University of London where he demonstrated an aptitude for finance and languages, eventually becoming fluent in English and French, in addition to his native German. During his time in London, von Bolschwing worked as an apprentice clerk for the shipping agency MacAndrew & Co., a subsidiary of the Royal Mail Steam Packet Company.

While attending the Faculty of Law at the University of Hamburg, von Bolschwing also began pursuing a career in international commerce, working for the East Asian trading house of C. Illies & Co. from 1928 to 1930. He was later employed as a manager with the Oberon Investment & Development Co. in Vienna and Berlin. During this time, von Bolschwing also established himself as a budding industrialist by acquiring ownership of the Upper Silesian Lime & Cement Works in 1931. However, when this enterprise quickly went bust amid the Great Depression, he returned to Great Britain where he found work acting as “continental representative” for a consortium of London-based investment banks, traveling extensively throughout central and southeastern Europe on business.

Von Bolschwing moved back to Königsberg in early-1932. In partnership with General Werner von Blomberg, he embarked on an effort to build a cement factory near the town of Heilsberg, East Prussia on behalf of the German Reichswehr. This venture ultimately failed to materialize when von Bolschwing was unable to obtain the necessary political support for the project from the Prussian Landtag. Von Bolschwing joined the then ascendent Nazi Party soon afterward, on 1 April 1932 (NSDAP # 984.212).

Later that year, he was dispatched to Sofia, Bulgaria as an arbitrator for Bank für Industrie-Obligationen (Bank for Industrial Bonds), a Düsseldorf merchant bank, to negotiate the installation of German-manufactured telephone equipment in the Balkans and Asia Minor. At this time, von Bolschwing also began an informal association with the German Foreign Office, providing the ministry with valuable political and economic information gathered during his travels abroad.

=== Mandatory Palestine ===
Adolf Hitler and the Nazi Party would come to power in Germany in January 1933. In September of that same year, von Bolschwing traveled to the British Mandate of Palestine to scout potential business opportunities and he soon established an import-export firm, Amaneh, in Jerusalem. The company was moderately successful and eventually expanded to include subsidiary offices in Cairo and Beirut. During his time in Palestine, von Bolschwing also met and befriended the Austrian Nazi activist and Schutzstaffel (SS) officer Leopold von Mildenstein. Von Bolschwing soon became a fixture of von Mildenstein’s social circle and established himself as something of a protege. This relationship would prove enormously consequential to von Bolschwing’s future career under the Nazis.

Von Mildenstein had established a reputation as an authority on Judaism and the Middle East within the Nazi Party and, in August 1934, he became a member of the Sicherheitsdienst (SD), the intelligence and security service of the SS, and was appointed as the director of Abteilung II/12 (Jewish Affairs) by SD chief Reinhard Heydrich. In this role, von Mildenstein formulated SS policy toward Germany’s Jews, which, at this early stage, was centered on stimulating the immigration of Jewish citizens beyond the borders of the Third Reich. To this end, von Mildenstein emerged as a vocal proponent of Zionism as a method well-suited to resolve the official impasse within the Nazi government over how best to rectify the so-called “Jewish Question”. Once in office, von Mildenstein used his influence to secure a significant posting with the SD for his friend and mentee, Otto von Bolschwing, who was subsequently assigned to Abteilung III/112 (Foreign Intelligence) as a covert operative (Vertrauensmann). It was in this capacity that he returned to Palestine in late-1934.

As an undercover agent of the SD, von Bolschwing was tasked with collecting political intelligence regarding British operations in Mandatory Palestine. In the course of his intelligence work, von Bolschwing posed as a monk in Nazareth and later operated under commercial cover as an importer in Haifa and Jerusalem. Through his business associations, von Bolschwing established contact with Fievel Polkes, a senior commander of the Zionist militant organization Haganah. In a series of clandestine negotiations, von Bolschwing and Polkes brokered an agreement in which the SD would permit Haganah to operate recruiting and training camps in Germany where Jewish youths would receive paramilitary instruction and encouragement to emigrate to Palestine to join the struggle to establish a Jewish state. In exchange, Haganah agreed to provide the SD with intelligence regarding British political and military activities in Palestine.

Von Bolschwing's efforts were intended to serve several different elements of Nazi foreign policy. Foremost, to render Palestine an ungovernable political liability for the British. The creation of a Jewish homeland in the Middle East would also provide the Third Reich with a location where it could expel its unwanted Jewish citizens. At the same time he was bargaining with Polkes, von Bolschwing was also meeting secretly with Arab leaders in an effort to encourage them to form a united front with militant Zionists in order to stage a rebellion against the British presence in Palestine. Von Bolschwing's covert efforts on behalf of the SD were eventually uncovered by British authorities and he was ultimately expelled from Palestine in December 1935.

=== Office of Jewish Affairs ===
Following his return to Germany, von Bolschwing continued to pursue a career with the SD and joined the staff of the Jewish Affairs Office (Judenreferat), as a consultant on Zionism and Palestinian affairs to his benefactor Leopold von Mildenstein. In this position, von Bolschwing would author numerous reports and policy proposals outlining various punitive measures designed to eliminate the Jewish presence in Germany through a campaign of forced emigration and economic restrictions.

Dissatisfied with the pace of Jewish migration to Palestine, Heydrich removed von Mildenstein as head of the Judenreferat in July 1936, eventually replacing him with Herbert Hagen. The departure of von Bolschwing’s patron also marked a major shift in the overall policy of the SS and the SD regarding Jewish emigration; away from von Mildenstein’s pro-Zionist approach and in favor of increasingly harsher tactics. Von Bolschwing quickly adapted his work to fit this new regime. In January 1937, he wrote a memorandum concerning Jewish emigration, recommending riots and attacks on Jews of the sort that occurred in Berlin in 1935:

A largely anti-Jewish atmosphere must be created among the people in order to form the basis for the continued attack and the effective exclusion of them...The most effective means of depriving the Jews of their sense of security is the wrath of the people that expresses itself in riots. Even though this method is illegal, it has, as shown by the 'Kurfürstendamm Riot', had a longstanding effect[.]

Von Bolschwing's report suggested using this kind of organized, but unlawful, street violence in combination with blatantly discriminatory but legal bureaucratic measures such as economic sanctions, special taxes, and passport controls to purge Germany of its Jews. Heinrich Himmler was impressed with the document, and assigned von Bolschwing to work as a senior advisor to the Deputy Director of the Jewish Affairs Office, Adolf Eichmann. From 1937-38, von Bolschwing would become Eichmann's primary mentor on Jewish matters and Zionism. During his 1961 trial in Israel, Eichmann stated that von Bolschwing "spoke so knowledgeably" and that he "kept in touch with Herr von Bolschwing" about his (Eichmann's) primary matter of concern, i.e. expropriation of assets of German citizens who were Jewish and expelling them from Germany.

Over the ensuing years, von Bolschwing authored dozens more memos and reports detailing useful administrative methods by which to persecute Germany's Jews. His suggestions to Eichmann included the expropriation of Jewish assets and property, the labeling of their passports, and allowing Jews to leave Germany but not to return. Rather than advocating the mass murder of Jews, von Bolschwing proposed making their lives so unbearable that they would opt to leave Germany voluntarily and permanently. In another memorandum submitted to Eichmann, von Bolschwing stated that Jews "are and must always be an eternal enemy of National Socialism...[and they] are among the most dangerous enemies."

Von Bolschwing would also play a central role in planning Hagen and Eichmann's 1937 visit to Palestine as well as arranging two secret conferences in Cairo and Vienna between Eichmann and his former Haganah interlocutor Fievel Polkes to discuss the potential relocation of German Jews to Palestine. These events solidified Eichmann's reputation as the SD's foremost Judenberater (Jewish expert), creating the foundation for his later career as the administrative architect of the Holocaust. Von Bolschwing married his first wife, Brigitte Klenzendorff, in March 1938. The couple had one child, Gisbert Otto Richard Ernst von Bolschwing, who was born in July 1939.

Through his work for the Judenreferat, von Bolschwing also fostered professional alliances with a number of high-ranking SD officials in addition to Eichmann:

- Director of SD-Amt II (Ideological Evaluation) and chief of staff at the Hauptamt Volksdeutsche Mittelstelle (VoMi) Hermann Behrends;
- Heinz Jost, Chief of SD-Amt III (Foreign Defense);
- Head of SD-Abteilung II/12 (Political Opposition) Werner Göttsch;
- Alfred Naujocks, a senior operative with the SD's "Technical Services" division and it's Foreign Intelligence Service.

These connections, particularly that with Jost, were vital in advancing Von Bolschwing’s career in the security services. This process of elevating himself through the cultivation of influential personalities would become a recurring tactic throughout von Bolschwing’s life.

Following the German annexation of Austria, Eichmann was sent to Vienna and with the responsibility of crafting a solution to the "Jewish question" in the newly acquired territory. He appointed von Bolschwing to serve as his primary adjutant. The two men worked together to put in place many of the policies relating to forced immigration and the confiscation of Jewish property that von Bolschwing had articulated during his earlier service at the Jewish Affairs Office in Berlin. This collaboration was a major success for both Eichmann and von Bolschwing and led to the establishment of the Central Agency for Jewish Emigration in Vienna. This agency was the prototype for SS organizations used to deport Jews in Amsterdam, Prague and many other European cities.

== World War II ==
=== Romania ===
With the outbreak of World War II on 1 September 1939, German policy toward the Jews shifted from voluntary emigration to forced deportation by rail train cattle cars. Eichmann and von Bolschwing returned from Austria and to work for the newly-established Reich Security Main Office (RSHA), the police and security arm of the Nazi state. Eichmann assumed leadership of the Gestapo's Referat IV B4 (Jewish Affairs and Evacuation) while von Bolschwing was assigned to the Ausland-SD Amt VI (Foreign Security Service). Von Bolschwing was formally inducted into the Allgemeine SS (SS # 353.603) on 30 December 1939. He was accorded the rank of SS-Untersturmführer (second lieutenant) and served as a consultant to SS-Brigadeführer Heinz Jost, the director of the Ausland-SD. His new superior was impressed with von Bolschwing’s aristocratic pedigree, describing him in one internal RSHA memo as "being extremely intelligent, supple and well-bred".

In March 1940 von Bolschwing received a prestigious appointment to the German embassy in Bucharest, Romania as Sonderbeauftragter (Special Representative) to the autocratic government of King Carol II. In this role, von Bolschwing directed SD intelligence operations in Romania, including the supervision of all SD agents operating in the country.

In Bucharest, von Bolschwing quickly aligned himself with the ultra-nationalist Iron Guard, Romania’s foremost fascist and anti-Semitic political movement. Von Bolschwing’s efforts to promote the political fortunes of the Iron Guard initially met with success. In September 1940 Marshal Ion Antonescu, with Iron Guard support, forced the abdication of Carol II and installed himself as dictator of Romania. Under the new regime, known as the National Legionary State, the Iron Guard was politically dominant, with five of their members taking over government ministries, including Foreign Affairs and the Interior. A raft of anti-Jewish laws were swiftly implemented. Many of them, such as the required registration of all Jewish property, were patterned on similar edicts instituted in Austria by Eichmann and von Bolschwing.

The political arrangement between Antonescu and the Iron Guard broke down following the events of the November 1940 Jilava massacre. Acting on his own initiative, von Bolschwing conspired with Iron Guard leaders Horia Sima and Valerian Trifa to organize a violent attempt to overthrow the Antonescu government. The so-called Legionnaires Rebellion of 20–23 January 1941 was accompanied by a shockingly brutal pogrom against the Jews of Bucharest. The city’s Jewish quarter was fire-bombed and several synagogues were looted and torched by Iron Guard death squads. 630 people, 125 of them Romanian Jews, were killed in the violence, with another 400 reported missing. Dozens of Jews were gruesomely murdered in a local slaughterhouse. According to U.S. Ambassador to Romania Franklin Mott Gunther:

Sixty Jewish corpses [were discovered] on the hooks used for carcasses. They were all skinned...and the quantity of blood was evidence that they had been skinned alive.

The revolt was eventually crushed by the Romanian military, which had remained loyal to Antonescu. In the aftermath of the failed coup, von Bolschwing sheltered thirteen high-ranking Iron Guard members, Horia Sima and Valerian Trifa among them, in the SD residence on the grounds of the German Embassy in Bucharest, much to the outrage of the German Ambassador, Manfred Freiherr von Killinger. Von Bolschwing would later arrange for the escape of the Iron Guard leaders from Romania to Bulgaria. On 30 January 1941, von Bolschwing was promoted to the rank of SS-Hauptsturmführer (captain). However, his blatant meddling in Romania's domestic political affairs enraged not only the Antonescu regime, which demanded his immediate withdrawal from Bucharest, but also the German Foreign Office, which was then seeking to cultivate Antonescu as a potential ally in the impending invasion of the Soviet Union later that year.

=== Decline and imprisonment ===
Despite the intense controversy his actions in Bucharest had provoked, von Bolschwing’s status as a favorite of Ausland-SD chief Heinz Jost shielded him from consequences in the immediate aftermath of the Legionnaires' rebellion. In an effort to salvage his protege’s career, Jost issued a “post-factum” approval of the attempted coup and von Bolschwing’s part in it. While this gesture would allow von Bolschwing to continue functioning as a leading operative of the SD for the time being, it failed to mollify German Foreign Minister Joachim von Ribbentrop and the breach between the security services and the Foreign Office over the events in Bucharest continued to grow.

After departing his post in Romania in March 1941, Von Bolschwing traveled to Sofia, Bulgaria in order to facilitate the “safe transport” of the Iron Guard leadership into exile in Germany. While there, von Bolschwing received orders from Berlin that he was to serve as the chief intelligence officer for the SD in northern Greece during the now imminent Balkan offensive. Von Bolschwing was appointed commander of the SS security unit Sonderkommando Saloniki and took part in Operation Marita, the German invasion of Greece, in April 1941. He established the headquarters of his Kommando in the port of Thessaloniki shortly after the city was occupied by the Wehrmacht. However, von Bolschwing’s time as the SD intelligence chief in northern Greece was extremely brief. In May 1941, after just a month in Thessaloniki, he was released from command after protesting to the RSHA that he was “not qualified for such police-military duties”.

In August 1941, von Bolschwing was assigned to the German-occupied Netherlands. Following the war, he would claim to American authorities that, while serving in Holland, he had been tasked by Jost with establishing a communication back-channel between the Ausland-SD and British intelligence via the embassy of neutral Portugal. After being recalled to Berlin in December 1941, von Bolschwing discovered events at the RSHA during his absence had seriously undermined his position within the security services. The career of von Bolschwing’s main political patron, Heinz Jost, was in decline. By late 1941, Jost was embroiled in a bitter power struggle with his deputy, Walter Schellenberg, who enjoyed the backing of the powerful RSHA chief Reinhard Heydrich. Jost was ousted as director of the Ausland-SD in March 1942. Without Jost’s protection, von Bolschwing was removed from his position with the Ausland-SD and severely reprimanded for his insubordination and disregard of diplomatic protocol in Bucharest.

While von Bolschwing was allowed to retain his rank and membership in the SS, he effectively became persona non grata throughout the organization and its security apparatus. With his once promising career with RSHA now definitively at an end, von Bolschwing went to Vienna, where he was hospitalized for an undisclosed illness from January to July 1942. Following his release, von Bolschwing was arrested by the Gestapo in September 1942 and incarcerated at Gestapo Headquarters in Berlin, likely as punishment for his actions in Bucharest, though no formal charges were ever filed against him. After seven months of confinement, von Bolschwing emerged from prison in April 1943 with his reputation badly tarnished.

=== Austria ===
Following his release from prison, the demise of his SS career, and his divorce from his first wife, von Bolschwing turned his attention to the expropriation of Jewish property, opportunistically seeking to apply the expertise he had gained at the Office of Jewish Affairs to reinvigorate his sagging fortunes. Von Bolschwing traveled to Amsterdam, where he secured a lucrative partnership with Bank voor Onroerende Zaken (Bank of Real Estate), an investment house that specialized in the seizure of assets and property belonging to Jewish citizens of the German occupied-Netherlands. In mid-1943 von Bolschwing also participated in the Aryanization of Chemiefirma, a formerly Jewish-owned medical device and supply company in Hamburg. After illegally acquiring 20 percent ownership of the company for himself, von Bolschwing took over the management of Chemiefirma's Vienna office and facilitated its use as a front organization by the Abwehr, the German military intelligence service.

In October 1943 von Bolschwing remarried, taking as his second wife Ruth von Pfaundler, an Austrian national whose brother was a high-ranking member of O-5, an Austrian anti-Nazi resistance group. In late-1944, with the tide of war having turned decisively against Nazi Germany, von Bolschwing moved with his family to Salzburg, Austria. He soon abandoned his previous loyalties to the Nazi Party and the SS and, under the auspices of his new brother-in-law, von Bolschwing served as a partisan of the Austrian Resistance in the Tyrolean Alps during the closing months of the war.

Von Bolschwing was formally expelled from the SS in February 1945 and by April of that year he was collaborating directly with the headquarters of the U.S. Army’s 71st Infantry Division. He established himself as a seemingly valuable asset, providing intelligence on German troop movements and also serving as a guide for U.S. forces during the campaign in Tyrol. In a postwar testimonial, a senior officer of the 71st Infantry, Lt. Colonel Ray F. Goggin, lauded his efforts, stating that von Bolschwing captured 20 high-ranking Nazi officials and SS officers and led patrols that resulted in the capture of many more.

== Post-war espionage ==
=== Gehlen Organization ===
Following the end of World War II in Europe, von Bolschwing became associated with the U.S. Army Counter-Intelligence Corps (CIC) detachment in Salzburg and worked for the American military government (OMGUS) in Bavaria from 1945 to 1946. Eager to insulate himself from possible prosecution for war crimes, von Bolschwing sought to capitalize on the emerging Cold War against the Soviet Union in order to further ingratiate himself to his American benefactors. In early-1947, he offered his services to the Vienna office of the Central Intelligence Group (CIG), the immediate predecessor of the CIA, but was rejected. In a contemporaneous assessment, U.S. officials dismissed von Bolschwing as an unreliable opportunist and egotistical, and accurately perceived him as a man of shifting loyalties.

Von Bolschwing was undeterred and obtained a position as a covert operative with the Gehlen Organization, an American-subsidized West German intelligence service staffed primarily by former officials of the Third Reich. He was attached to Ausodeom, the Gehlen Organization’s Austrian branch, and posted in Vienna, where he recruited potential undercover agents and orchestrated their infiltration into Romania, Hungary, and other nations of the Soviet Bloc.

With the advent of the Greek Civil War (1946-1949), von Bolschwing’s superiors in the Gehlen Organization were anxious for information on Soviet activities in the Balkans and directed him to mobilize his former contacts among exiled members of the Iron Guard in order to reconstruct his former SD intelligence network in Romania. In 1948, von Bolschwing traveled to Rome, Italy where he met with Constantin Papanace, the leader of a faction of exiled former Iron Guard members, and enlisted his assistance in building an anti-Soviet espionage apparatus in Romania. This effort produced mediocre results. Few Iron Guardsmen were interested in leaving exile and returning to their homeland as spies and those who did formed an intelligence network that was regularly penetrated by Soviet agents, yielding information that was of negligible value.

Despite this lackluster outcome, his employment by the Gehlen Organization was extremely beneficial to von Bolschwing personally. His organization received a sum of roughly US$20,000 annually to maintain operations, while von Bolschwing personally held a lucrative cover occupation with Austria Verlags GmbH, a U.S.-funded publishing house associated with the Austrian League for the United Nations. More importantly, he was also able to leverage his connections to the American and West German intelligence communities to secure a preliminary clearance of his wartime record from an Austrian denazification court. However, by 1949 the Gehlen Organization had lost confidence in von Bolschwing’s abilities and his ouster from the group appeared imminent.

=== Central Intelligence Agency ===
Ironically, as von Bolschwing’s star was fading within the Gehlen Organization, events would produce a situation that enabled him to achieve his initial postwar ambition of working directly for U.S. intelligence. In the autumn of 1949, the Central Intelligence Agency (CIA) initiated an overhaul of U.S.-sponsored espionage activities in Austria in an effort to streamline operations in preparation for the coming end of the Allied occupation. The decision was made to dissolve Ausodeum, the Gehlen Organization’s Austrian sub-section, and to incorporate the group’s former assets that were deemed most valuable into the CIA. Von Bolschwing was among the operatives to be evaluated.

In his bid to join the CIA, von Bolschwing found a supporter in James H. Critchfield, the influential chief of the CIA station in Pullach, Bavaria and previously the Agency's primary liaison with Ausodeum. Despite the middling results of his Romanian operation and his questionable abilities as an agent, Critchfield nevertheless viewed von Bolschwing as an invaluable potential asset with useful anti-Soviet contacts throughout central and eastern Europe, which he conveyed to his superiors in Washington.

Whereas U.S. intelligence agencies had rejected von Bolschwing as self-serving and disloyal in 1947, the major intensification of the Cold War over the ensuing two years led them to see those matters as less vital by 1949. Von Bolschwing had also impressed his CIA interlocutors with claims that his previous employer, the Gehlen Organization, was likely compromised by Soviet intelligence due to its reliance on former Wehrmacht officers to fill its upper-ranks. He would later complain to U.S. officials:

The French, British and also Russians had gotten ahold of a large number of [German] Staff Officers. Each one of them was using them in intelligence work. Recognizing the traditional closeness of most German intelligence personnel and most Staff Officers, I feared we were being penetrated by the East, rather than penetrating them.

The strategy proved effective and by February 1950 von Bolschwing was working on behalf of the CIA station in Pullach as a case officer, serving under the Agency cryptonym: "Unrest". He also received ample U.S. funding in order to establish another smaller and more secretive West German intelligence service that was intended to operate parallel to the Gehlen Organization. While continuing to direct the infiltration of CIA assets into Communist-controlled eastern Europe, von Bolschwing’s group also secretly monitored the actions and personnel of the Gehlen Organization for disloyalty or potential penetration by Soviet intelligence. Bolschwing specialized in sending agents into Hungary and Romania. American journalist Christopher Simpson wrote: "There can be little doubt that the U.S. intelligence agencies that made extensive use of von Bolschwing were aware of his role in the Bucharest pogrom".

=== Cover-up ===
During this period, CIA knowledge about the specifics of von Bolschwing’s Nazi past was limited. In his interactions with CIA officials, von Bolschwing acknowledged that he had been a member of both the Nazi Party and the SS, but claimed that he was not a believer in Hitler's anti-Semitic racial ideology and aggressive expansionism. Instead von Bolschwing attributed his Nazi affiliations to his supposedly vigorous opposition to Soviet-style communism and his belief that the Nazi movement had represented the most effective means of combating it at the time. Citing his prewar standing as a propertied aristocrat and financier, von Bolschwing presented his choice to join the Nazi Party as a straightforward and practical decision, motivated entirely by a desire to preserve his wealth and status.

In September 1949 von Bolschwing submitted a curriculum vitae to the CIA that conveniently made no mention of the three years he worked for the Office of Jewish Affairs. Similarly, a detailed background report on von Bolschwing, commissioned by Critchfield while evaluating him for potential CIA service, also completely omitted any information about his involvement with the Judenreferat or his association with Adolf Eichmann. No effort was made by U.S. officials to fill in the gaps in either document.

Even without the Eichmann information, enough was known about von Bolschwing’s unsavory past that the CIA understood that any revelation of his work on their behalf would prove a serious embarrassment. His association with the Bucharest pogrom and the sheltering of the Iron Guard leaders was widely known, as was the extent of his dishonesty. U.S. dealings with such a disreputable figure caused discomfort among some CIA officials. As one Agency memorandum noted:

He is an adventurer, a lover of intrigue, and a wire-puller who is fond of power. Bolschwing states that in his position in Rumania [sic] he was able to frustrate many of the evil designs of the Nazi regime, but it should be remembered as a black mark against him rather than a point in his favor that he arranged the escape of [Horia] Sima and others when these men were at the height of their crimes.

Exigencies of Cold War politics compelled the CIA to maintain its relationship with von Bolschwing in spite of these misgivings.

Matters became more complicated for von Bolschwing and his American sponsors in 1950 when the Austrian Ministry of the Interior began inquiring about the former SS officer’s presence in their country. At this time, von Bolschwing was not an Austrian citizen, had never paid taxes and was still awaiting formal denazification. Von Bolschwing continued to deny that he was ever an active member of the Nazi Party or the SS, prompting Austrian officials to request that U.S. occupation authorities in Germany provide them with whatever documentation they had regarding his wartime activities and associations. Critchfield and the CIA officers in Pullach, however, were aware that von Bolschwing’s SS personnel records, housed in the Berlin Document Center (BDC), would not only easily discredit their agent’s claims, but also expose his previous employment with the RSHA and his connection to the Bucharest pogrom, creating a major scandal for the Agency.

With the support of Richard Helms, Chief of German Operations for the CIA in Washington, Critchfield overcame the objections of the Agency’s Berlin case officer Peter Sichel and had the incriminating files removed from the BDC. In a cable to the CIA station chiefs in Berlin and Karlsruhe, Helms justified he and Critchfield’s actions by emphasizing that it was imperative to maintain von Bolschwing’s ability to carry on his work for the Agency unimpeded. Despite this seeming vote of confidence, by mid-1951 both Helms and the CIA in Pullach had soured on von Bolschwing and his intelligence network’s mediocre output, in much the same way the Gehlen Organization had in 1949. In an internal memorandum, Critchfield concluded that von Bolschwing would never develop into a first class agent.

Critchfield transferred responsibility for von Bolschwing and his network to the CIA’s operating base in Salzburg, where, despite his underperformance, von Bolschwing was elevated to the role of the Agency’s principal agent in Austria in January 1952. He was once again tasked with establishing an intelligence-gathering network, this time in Czechoslovakia, but the results were just as inadequate as those of his previous attempts in Romania. By early-1953, one year into their contract with von Bolschwing, the CIA in Austria decided to close the Romanian network down permanently. With that, von Bolschwing’s career as an intelligence agent was essentially finished.

=== Emigration to the United States ===
In July 1953, the CIA’s Austrian section recommended to headquarters in Washington that von Bolschwing be granted U.S. citizenship in order for him to resume his work in Austria as a formal CIA officer. CIA headquarters, however, balked at the notion of continuing to employ von Bolschwing and was eager to cut ties with him. In this, they were supported by von Bolschwing's former champion, Pullach station chief James Critchfield, who had now come to view von Bolschwing as a charlatan. Warning his superiors in Washington:

If an agency takes [von Bolschwing] over without knowing his past, they will inevitably be bogged down in a series of "assessment periods" and grandiose schemes employing scores of people to exploit shadowy figures...via courier lines that never seem to materialize. They will be faced with large payrolls for piddling returns and masses of paper on all the relatively inconsequential aspects of his operation.

Though the CIA was unwilling to continue employing von Bolschwing as an agent, it agreed to bring him to the U.S., as an appropriate reward for his "long faithful service to U.S. intelligence". It was a complex and drawn out undertaking as von Bolschwing’s membership in the Nazi Party and the SS made him ineligible for a visa, let alone citizenship. To sidestep this, von Bolschwing leaned heavily on his brief service with the Austrian Resistance in his dealings with U.S. immigration officials and portrayed his 1942-43 imprisonment by the Gestapo, for his role in the Legionnaires’ Revolt, as resulting from his principled opposition to the Nazi regime. In a document submitted in support of his bid for immigration, von Bolschwing shamelessly maintained that he hadn't been on the payroll of the SS or the Nazi Party.

Despite this, the CIA made no effort to conceal von Bolschwing’s Nazi affiliations, recognizing its futility. It did, however, task its Eastern European Division with coordinating von Bolschwing’s movements with the Immigration and Naturalization Service (INS). The Agency also went to great lengths to circumvent the routine character inquiries carried out on prospective U.S. citizens by the State Department. CIA sources in Austria provided von Bolschwing with falsified police and military background reports that contained no derogatory information about his wartime activities. They would also expedite the issuing of travel documents to von Bolschwing and his family, via the U.S. Consulate in Munich, in August 1953. CIA headquarters in Washington would later intervene directly with the INS, falsely claiming that they had already conducted the necessary background checks on von Bolschwing and found nothing that would preclude his entry into the United States.

A major difficulty would emerge in late-1953, when the CIA in Austria turned up agent reports during an examination of its archives. Both reports contained the damaging revelation that von Bolschwing had worked closely with Adolf Eichmann in the Office of Jewish Affairs. A polygraph test was administered to von Bolschwing in which he was asked directly if he had ever known Adolf Eichmann. Von Bolschwing lied, claiming he had met his former direct superior at the SD only twice. The polygraph registered his deception, but the Agency had already made its decision. The test administrator issued a dismissive response to his superiors, stating that von Bolschwing had only been dishonest regarding “a minor point”.

Amid preparations for his departure, CIA officials in Salzburg advised von Bolschwing that, despite INS knowledge of his Nazi past, he should avoid mentioning any association with the Party or the SS following his arrival in the United States. The Agency was fearful that, should von Bolschwing reveal his previous work for the Third Reich, the INS “would be forced, for appearances sake” to deport him, but the CIA was also cognizant of the fact that if he were to deny these affiliations completely in an official setting, it could also invite potential legal difficulties.

In January 1954, von Bolschwing, with his wife and son, departed Genoa, Italy, aboard the ocean liner SS Andrea Doria bound for New York City, using the pseudonym of U.S. Army Captain Albert D. Eisner, a fictitious identity provided by the CIA. Following their arrival on 2 February, the family were hosted in the Boston home of a former military intelligence officer who had previously worked with von Bolschwing in Europe. Having brought him to the U.S. in what it saw as a reward for his service, the CIA terminated its relationship with von Bolschwing, ordering him to break off all relations and to contact the Agency only in the event of a "dire emergency" which was a "life or death situation."

== Life in the United States ==
=== Business career ===
In the United States, von Bolschwing and his family settled in the Yorkville neighborhood of Manhattan where he initially worked as an electrician at a power station operated by General Electric. He would utilize his skill with languages and his knowledge of international commerce to establish a lucrative private sector career. In 1955, von Bolschwing was hired as a tax and foreign trade specialist with the New Jersey–based pharmaceutical company Warner-Lambert. By 1957, he was working as chief assistant to the Director of International Operations and consulting on several of Warner-Lambert’s international projects in Western Europe, traveling there many times on company business.

Von Bolschwing cultivated social and professional connections with influential people. During his time at Warner-Lambert, these contacts included the company’s chief executive officer (CEO), Elmer Holmes Bobst, and the honorary president of Warner-Lambert's board of directors, former New Jersey governor Alfred E. Driscoll. In 1959, von Bolschwing applied to become a U.S. citizen. He omitted his membership in the Nazi Party and the SS from the application, though he was legally required to disclose these affiliations under U.S. law and had been told to do so by the CIA. Von Bolschwing was granted citizenship later that year. With his status as an American now secure, von Bolschwing and his family relocated to West Orange, New Jersey where he pursued a career in government and politics. Through his connections to Bobst and Driscoll, von Bolschwing established ties to the New Jersey Republican Party.

Matters were complicated for von Bolschwing in May 1960 when Adolf Eichmann was abducted by agents of the Mossad in Argentina. Eichmann was subsequently smuggled to the State of Israel to face trial, and eventual execution, for his role in perpetrating the Holocaust. Von Bolschwing correctly predicted that his name would be mentioned during the course of Eichmann’s trial and feared that any renewed investigation would uncover his own role in the persecution and murder of European Jews under the Nazis. Von Bolschwing contacted his former CIA handlers, claiming he feared his own abduction by Israeli authorities due to his connection to Eichmann and requested their protection. This surprised the CIA’s Counterintelligence staff, who had been unaware of von Bolschwing’s involvement with the Jewish Affairs Office; they began their own investigation to determine the Agency’s exposure in sheltering an alleged war criminal.

As the Eichmann trial continued, von Bolschwing’s efforts to obtain government office in the U.S. succeeded. In 1961, he was nominated by the U.S. State Department to serve as a representative of the International Cooperation Administration (the precursor of the U.S. Agency for International Development) in New Delhi, India. By this time, the CIA inquiry into von Bolschwing’s association with Eichmann had unearthed unfavorable information that the Agency was anxious to keep concealed. In a meeting with CIA officials in Manhattan, von Bolschwing was informed that his dishonesty on his citizenship application in 1959 was grounds for legal action against him and that the CIA was obligated to inform the U.S. Justice Department of his deceit, setting in motion his probable extradition to West Germany. Eager to avoid the political embarrassment this would entail, the Agency offered to continue to shield von Bolschwing from prosecution in exchange for the withdrawal of his candidacy for the post in India. Von Bolschwing accepted the arrangement and agreed to limit himself to the private sector. The CIA issued a directive advising its station chiefs in West Germany that, while von Bolschwing would be making regular trips to the country, he was doing so as a private citizen and not as a representative of the Agency.

This setback did not adversely impact von Bolschwing’s business career. By 1963, he and his family had relocated to Boston, where von Bolschwing worked as an executive of the Cabot Corporation, a multi-billion dollar specialty chemical conglomerate. Von Bolschwing was recruited by the company’s chairman, Thomas Dudley Cabot, to serve as the Chief Financial Officer (CFO) of Cabot’s West German subsidiary. In this capacity, von Bolschwing was instrumental in obtaining financing from the First National Bank of Boston for the development of a $50 million industrial complex in Frankfurt, West Germany dedicated to the production of the chemical compound carbon black. During this time von Bolschwing also maintained a profitable side project importing wine from South America.

=== TCI scandal ===
In March 1969 von Bolschwing and his family relocated to Sacramento, California, where he had been retained as a business consultant with the technology firm Trans-International Computer Investment Corporation (TCI), due to his extensive international business contacts. TCI held a controlling interest in various Silicon Valley–based subsidiaries involved in overseeing the development of high-volume computer networks for businesses as well as navigation systems for oil tankers employing satellite communications. The company’s portfolio also included multiple classified contracts with the U.S. Defense Department related to the possible military-applications of satellite technology.

Once established in Sacramento and working for TCI, von Bolschwing continued cultivating relationships with business and political figures. These included:

- San Francisco corporate lawyer, TCI board member, and U.S. Appeals Court judge William Newsom, father of California governor Gavin Newsom;
- aerospace developer and Fairchild Aircraft executive Emanuel Fthenakis;
- Helene von Damm, the personal secretary to then-California governor Ronald Reagan;
- billionaire philanthropist J. Paul Getty Jr., an heir to the Getty family petroleum fortune.

Getty was also a senior member of TCI’s Board of Directors. Getty’s intercession facilitated von Bolschwing's rapid appointment to the office of President of TCI in 1970.

Von Bolschwing’s success was upended later that year following a fraud investigation of TCI by the California Department of Corporations. Several of TCI's major shareholders were accused of syndicating their stock and selling it to small investors, a violation of Federal and state securities law requiring that all security sales be registered. The Department of Corporations suspended the trading of TCI stock and the ensuing scandal was denounced by the Sacramento County District Attorney’s Office as possibly the largest stock fraud in California history.

While several of TCI’s largest shareholders would be prosecuted in connection with the scheme, von Bolschwing was never formally implicated in any wrongdoing and retained his position as President. His efforts to arrest the company’s rapid deterioration in the aftermath of the scandal were unsuccessful and TCI soon collapsed, filing for bankruptcy in 1971.

=== Later life and Investigations ===
Following the collapse of TCI, von Bolschwing continued to reside in the Sacramento-area. In 1978, his third wife Beth, committed suicide following a protracted illness and, in Washington, an official inquiry into suspected Nazi war criminals residing in the United States was launched by the Immigration and Naturalization Service (INS), following pressure from the U.S. House Judiciary Committee. Among the first targets of the federal probe was Valerian Trifa, one of the Iron Guard members sheltered by von Bolschwing following the failed January 1941 rebellion, who had been living in the U.S. since 1950.

Their inquiry into Trifa eventually led INS investigators to von Bolschwing, whom they determined had lied about his past Nazi affiliations on his application for citizenship, a fact that made him liable for deportation from the United States. An investigation into von Bolschwing’s immigration status and wartime activities was initiated over the objections of the CIA, who claimed that an inquiry could potentially compromise the agency. Von Bolschwing denied that he had been a member of the SS or the Nazi Party, while acknowledging that he had aided in the escape of the Iron Guard leadership.

In September 1979 the federal investigation of von Bolschwing was transferred from the INS to the Office of Special Investigations (OSI), a specialized unit of the U.S. Justice Department dedicated to the identification and expulsion of former Nazis and Nazi-collaborators living in the United States. In January 1980, von Bolschwing moved to Greenhaven for Active Seniors, an assisted living community in Carmichael, California. It was there that he met and married his fourth wife, Agnes. A member of the Church of Jesus Christ of Latter Day Saints, Agnes von Bolschwing would later claim that her husband had converted to her faith during his final years and the two were married in a Mormon ceremony in March 1980. That same month, Nazi-hunter Simon Wiesenthal revealed von Bolschwing’s presence in the United States to the international media. The CIA subsequently dropped all opposition to the case against von Bolschwing.

Von Bolschwing was deposed by the OSI in February 1981. Under oath, he acknowledged his prior Nazi affiliations, but maintained that he had been directed to conceal those associations by the CIA. Von Bolschwing’s attorneys contended this claim nullified the OSI’s case against their client and declared they would fight the denaturalization in court. Nevertheless, OSI Director Allan A. Ryan, Jr. filed a three-count complaint against Otto von Bolschwing with the U.S. District Court for the Eastern District of California in May 1981. By this time, however, the elderly von Bolschwing was gravely ill, having been diagnosed with severe emphysema as well as progressive supranuclear palsy (PSP), a rare neurodegenerative disorder. In light of the circumstances, OSI Director Allan Ryan opted to conclude a plea agreement with von Bolschwing's legal representatives.

Under the terms of the arrangement, von Bolschwing publicly admitted that he had lied about his membership in the Nazi Party, the SS and the RSHA, but was not required to disclose his involvement with Eichmann, the Office of Jewish Affairs or the Bucharest pogrom. Von Bolschwing also agreed that he would not contest his loss of U.S. citizenship, which he surrendered. The OSI resolved that it would not attempt to deport him, given his poor health. The plea agreement was upheld by the U.S. District Court in Sacramento on 22 December 1981. Otto von Bolschwing died in a nursing home in Carmichael, California ten weeks later, on 7 March 1982. He was 72 years old.

Von Bolschwing remains the highest-ranking Nazi war criminal ever prosecuted by the Office of Special Investigations.

== Bibliography ==
- Klaus Eichner. Faschistische Ostexperten im Dienste der US-Geheimdienste" in: Holocaust-Täter im Dienste von BND und CIA. Kominform. 6 April 2008 (in German)
- Klaus POPA. Völkisches Handbuch Südosteuropa Online Lexikon B. 3 February 2010 (pdf) p. 84 (in German)
