= Szczurkowo =

- Village
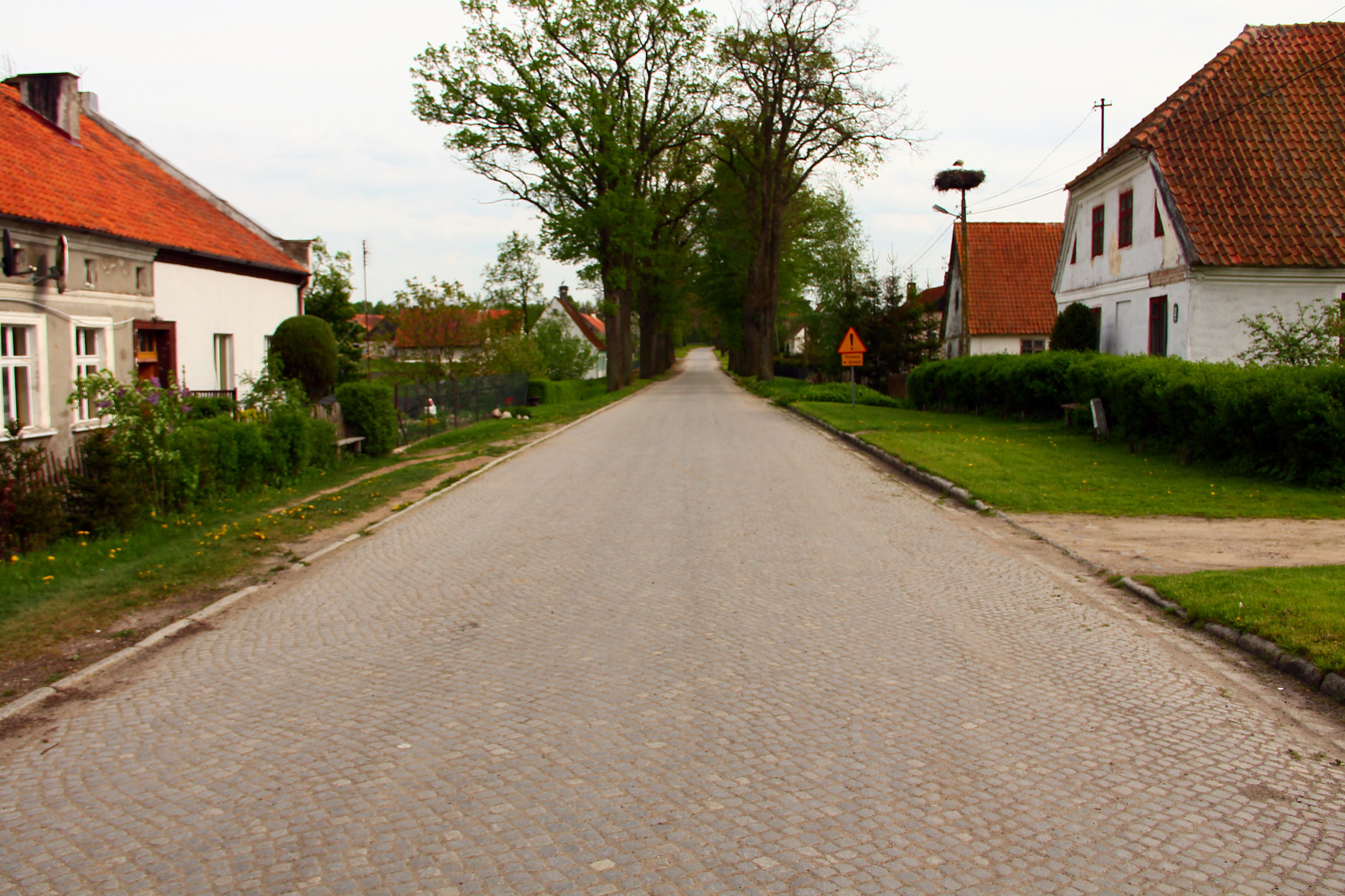
- View of the village
- Interactive map of Szczurkowo
- Location within Poland
- Coordinates: 54°21′12″N 20°54′9″E
- Country: Poland
- Voivodeship: Warmian-Masurian
- County: Bartoszyce
- Gmina: Sępopol

Szczurkowo [ʂt͡ʂurˈkɔvɔ] (German: Schönbruch) is a village in the administrative district of Gmina Sępopol, within Bartoszyce County, Warmian-Masurian Voivodeship, in northern Poland, at the border of Kaliningrad Oblast of Russia.

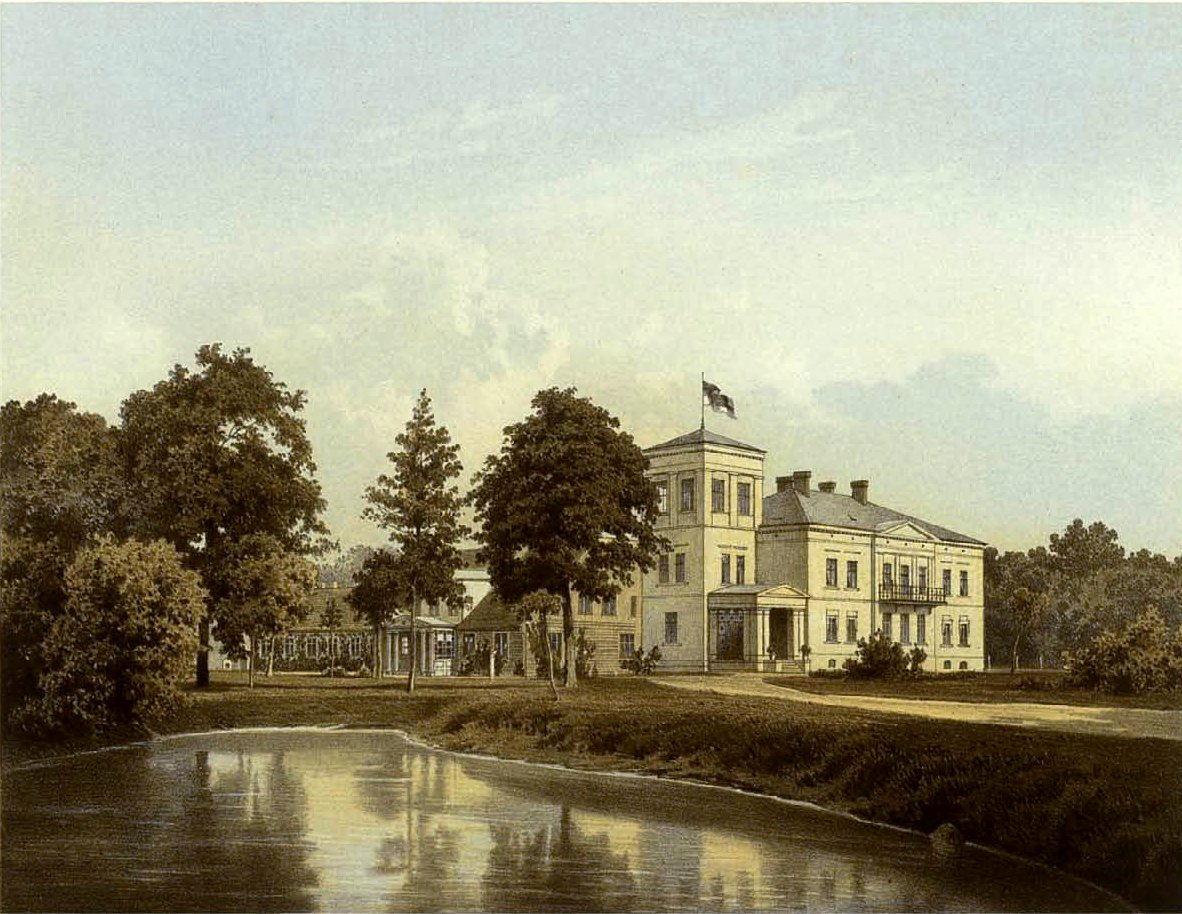
The manor house of Schönbruch about 1869 (burnt down in 1945)

Modern-day Szczurkowo is the southern part of the village that was partitioned in 1945 by the Poland–Russia border. The northern part is in the Kaliningrad Oblast and uninhabited.

== Notable residents ==
- Otto von Bolschwing (1909–1982), SS-Hauptsturmführer, intelligence officer and businessman

== Population ==
- 1931: 1,004
- 1939: 1,139

== Wildlife ==
Szczurkowo is one of the largest nesting sites of the white stork in Poland, with several pairs breeding here annually.
