= Friedrich von Bodelschwingh the Elder =

German theologian (1831–1910)

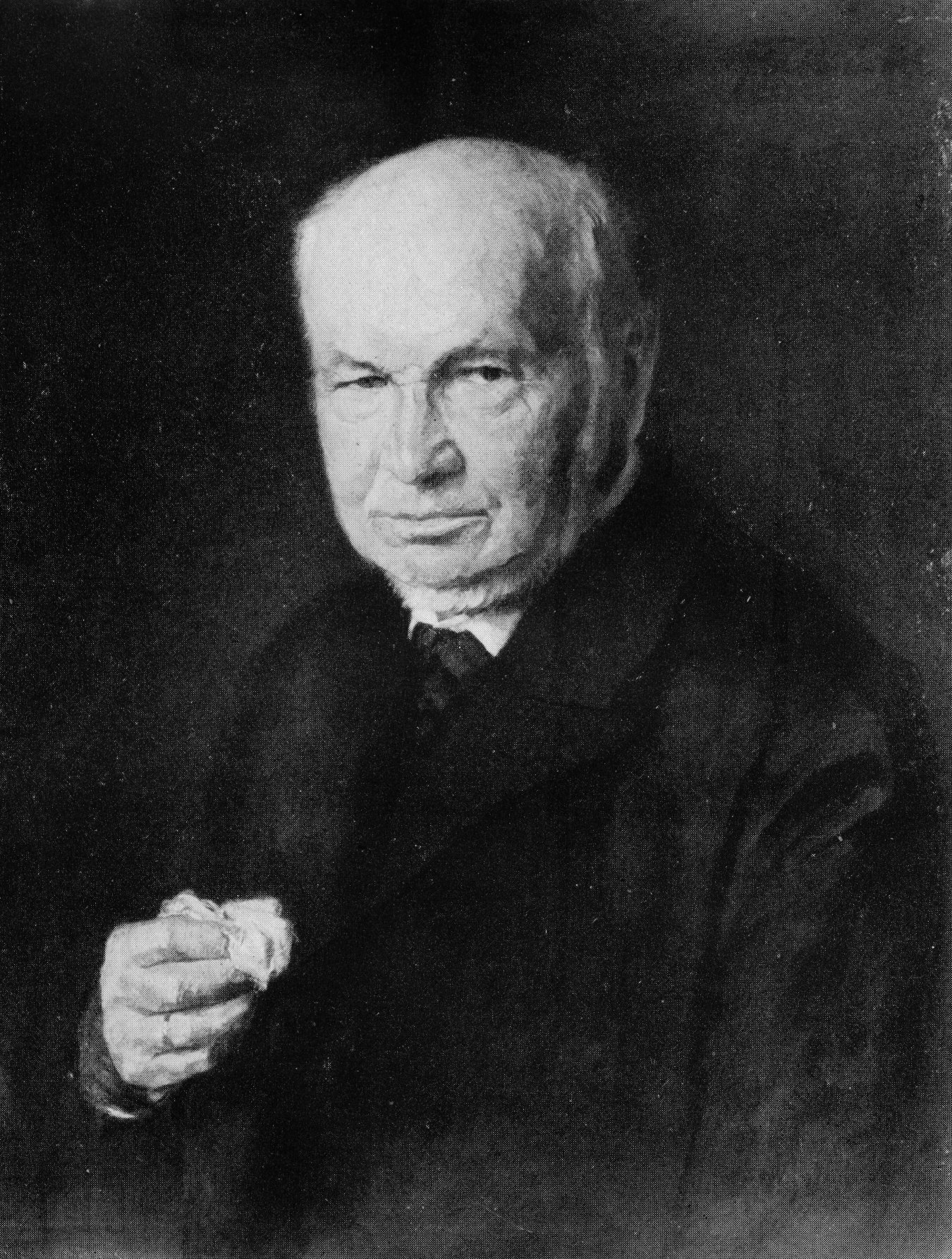
Friedrich von Bodelschwingh en 1906.

Friedrich Christian Carl von Bodelschwingh (* 6 March 1831 in Tecklenburg; † 2 April 1910 in Bielefeld-Bethel), better known as Friedrich von Bodelschwingh the Elder, was a German theologian and politician. He is remembered as the founder of the v. Bodelschwinghsche Anstalten Bethel charitable foundations.

== Life ==
The Bodelschwingh family belonged to a Westfalian nobility. Friedrich's father Ernst von Bodelschwingh was Prussia's Finance Minister. His family's links with the Hohenzollern made Friedrich von Bodelschwingh an early playmate of future emperor Friedrich III.

Friedrich von Bodelschwingh first wanted to study mining but eventually followed higher education in agriculture and became farm supervisor of a modern estate in Gramenz, in Eastern Pomerania, where he discovered the miserable situation of the landless farm workers.

Wanting to help the needy, he sought to engage in missionary activity but his parents convinced him to get a Protestant theology MA first. He studied in Basel, Erlangen and Berlin, and became a clergyman in 1863. His first parish was the German church in Paris. There were at the time in Paris about 80,000 German day labourers. Bodelschwingh raised money in Germany to build a church and a school near Buttes-Chaumont at 93 rue de Crimée, Paris 19e. From 1924, the premises became the Orthodox church and theological institute Saint-Serge.

In 1872, he became the head of a Protestant charity (which had been established in 1867 in Bielefeld) to take care of epileptic patients. Under his leadership, this institution became one of the most important ones among the German "inner Mission", extending their activity to all forms of handicap.

In 1885, in order to help the poor to become the owners of their house, he founded the first savings bank dedicated to the financing of housing in Germany.

In the 1890s he founded in Norddorf, on the island of Amrum, in the North Sea, a series of homes, destined to offer holidays in a Christian environment.

At the same time he pursued a political career as a royalist MP.

He died on 2 April 1910, and his son Friedrich von Bodelschwingh (nicknamed pastor Fritz) took over the management of the institutions by then identified by the name of Bodelschwingh (Bodelschwinghanstalten).

== Influence ==
Friedrich von Bodelschwingh senior invented and applied several unusual and innovative ideas which have captured donors' imagination and provided work to the poor. For instance, he launched a collection of used clothes which is still practised today (die Brockensammlung). The Swiss charity "the house of shreds" (das Brockenshaus) is continuing this activity today according to the Bodelschwingh principles, collecting, repairing and reselling old clothes. Friedrich von Bodelschwingh senior can be considered as the father of fundraising. Theodor Heuss would give him the nickname of the "most resourceful beggar Germany had ever seen." In 1951, the German federal Post Office paid tribute by dedicating him a postage stamp.
