= William Newsom =

American judge

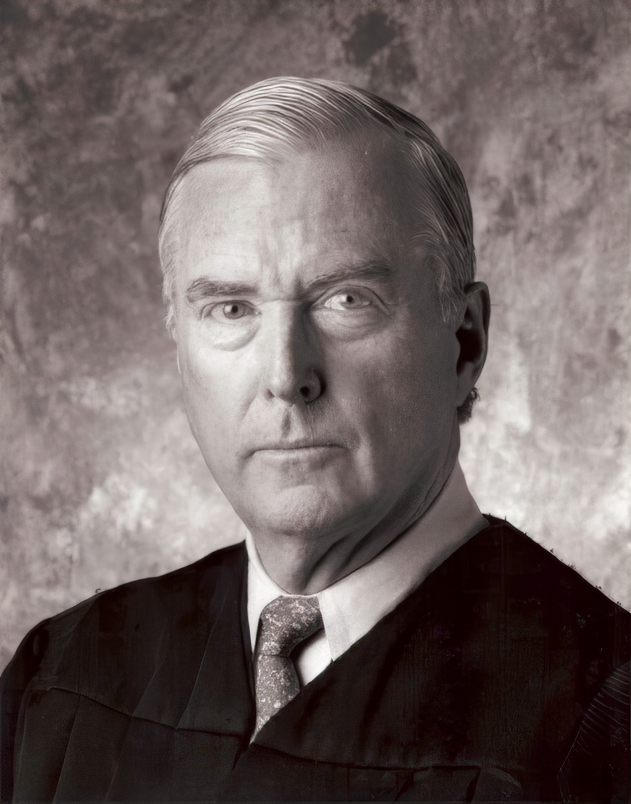
- Official portrait, c. 2004

Associate Justice of the California Court of Appeal, First District
- In office May 1, 1978 – September 29, 1995
- Appointed by: Jerry Brown
- Succeeded by: Douglas Swager

Judge of the Placer County Superior Court
- In office August 5, 1975 – May 1, 1978
- Appointed by: Jerry Brown
- Succeeded by: Wayne Wylie

Personal details
- Born: William Alfred Newsom III; February 15, 1934 San Francisco, California, U.S.
- Died: December 12, 2018 (aged 84) San Francisco, California, U.S.
- Party: Democratic
- Spouse: Tessa Thomas Menzies (m. 1966; div. 1972)
- Children: 2, including Gavin
- Education: University of San Francisco (BA); Stanford University (JD)
- Occupation: Judge, lawyer

William Alfred Newsom III (February 15, 1934 – December 12, 2018) was an American judge, administrator of the Getty family trust, and the father of California Governor Gavin Newsom.

== Early life and education ==
Newsom was born in San Francisco, California, the son of Christine Anne (née Brennan) and William A. Newsom II. All of his friends and family referred to him as Bill. A native San Franciscan, Newsom's father ran Pat Brown's campaign for San Francisco district attorney. Brown later became Governor of California.

Newsom's late sister Barbara was once married to Ron Pelosi, brother-in-law of U.S. Representative Nancy Pelosi. Newsom was a close friend of Gordon Getty, son of oil tycoon J. Paul Getty, who lived in his house during the 1940s while attending St. Ignatius Catholic prep school in San Francisco.

Newsom went to the University of San Francisco, followed by Stanford Law School and was admitted to the California Bar in 1962.

== Career ==
He worked as a legal adviser to the Italian division of Getty Oil and then as a tax attorney for the Getty family. Newsom helped to deliver the ransom money for the release of John Paul Getty III.

In 1967, he married Tessa Menzies, and had two children (including Gavin) before divorcing her after five years. In 1968, he ran unsuccessfully against California State Senator Milton Marks, a popular Republican. Newsom was also corporate counsel and a board member for Trans-International Computer Investment Corporation (TCI), which handled classified government contracts, for which Newsom was issued a National Security Clearance. TCI went bankrupt in 1971 after what the Sacramento District Attorney called "the biggest stock fraud in California history". For most of 1969 and 1970, Newsom traveled across Europe alongside former SS security service member Otto von Bolschwing who had been brought to the U.S. by the CIA under Operation Paperclip and appointed TCI's president by Getty due to his former Nazi intelligence connections and their value in obtaining defense technology contracts. Newsom referred to von Bolschwing as "suave", "plausible", and "world weary".

In 1975, Jerry Brown appointed Newsom to the Superior Court bench in Auburn (Placer County) and later to the state Court of Appeal in San Francisco, where he served until his retirement in 1995. In this role he ruled on several prominent cases including the right of privacy for people with HIV, the liability of the San Francisco 49ers for a player's injury and ruled against the prestigious Bohemian Club's ban on employing women. An advocate of rehabilitative justice, Newsom was also part of a panel of judges which ruled that the perpetrators of the 1976 Chowchilla mass kidnapping would be eligible for parole.

=== Investment management ===
Newsom served as a financial advisor for the Getty family businesses. He directly managed the Gordon P. Getty Family Trust, which is estimated at more than $2 billion. The trust earns about 2 percent a year resulting in approximately $40 million in annual income. He screened potential investments and made recommendations on real estate, stocks, bonds, and other ventures. "I make my living working for Gordon Getty", Newsom said in 2003.

=== Other interests ===
Newsom was a keen environmentalist and served on the boards of both the Sierra Club Foundation and the Environmental Defense Fund. He helped to found the Mountain Lion Preservation Foundation and was also a member of Earth Justice. He was also an advocate for otters and had one as a pet. During his judicial career he had had to curb his advocacy for environmental protection to maintain his professional neutrality. Newsom was also a keen walker and would take Gavin backpacking along the rivers of California. He had a large collection of books and would often read while in the bathtub.

Newsom married Tessa Menzies in 1966, and their son Gavin was born the next year; a daughter, Hilary Newsom Callan, followed in 1968. Newsom was divorced shortly afterwards and Tessa died in 2002 at the age of 55 from breast cancer. In 2004 he administered the oath of office to Gavin upon his election as mayor of San Francisco.

== Death ==
Newsom died of ulcerative colitis at his home in San Francisco on December 12, 2018, at the age of 84, just over a month after his son Gavin was elected governor.
