= Bethel Foundation =

Psychiatric hospital in Bielefeld, Germany

Bodelschwingh Foundation Bethel
- Established: 1867 (159 years ago)
- Types: nonprofit organization
- Aim: healthcare
- Headquarters: Bielefeld
- Country: Germany
- Coordinates: 52°00′48″N 8°31′23″E
- Chairpersons: Ulrich Pohl
- Revenue: 1,254,450,000 euro (2018)
- Total Assets: 90,436,079.55 euro (2024)
- Employees: 20,055 (2019)

The Bethel Foundation, officially the Bodelschwingh Foundation Bethel (German: von Bodelschwinghsche Stiftungen Bethel as of 2009, previously v. Bodelschwinghsche Anstalten Bethel) is a diaconal (i.e. Protestant charitable) psychiatric hospital in Bethel, formerly a part of the municipality of Gadderbaum, today a neighbourhood of Bielefeld, Germany, and the biggest social business in Europe.

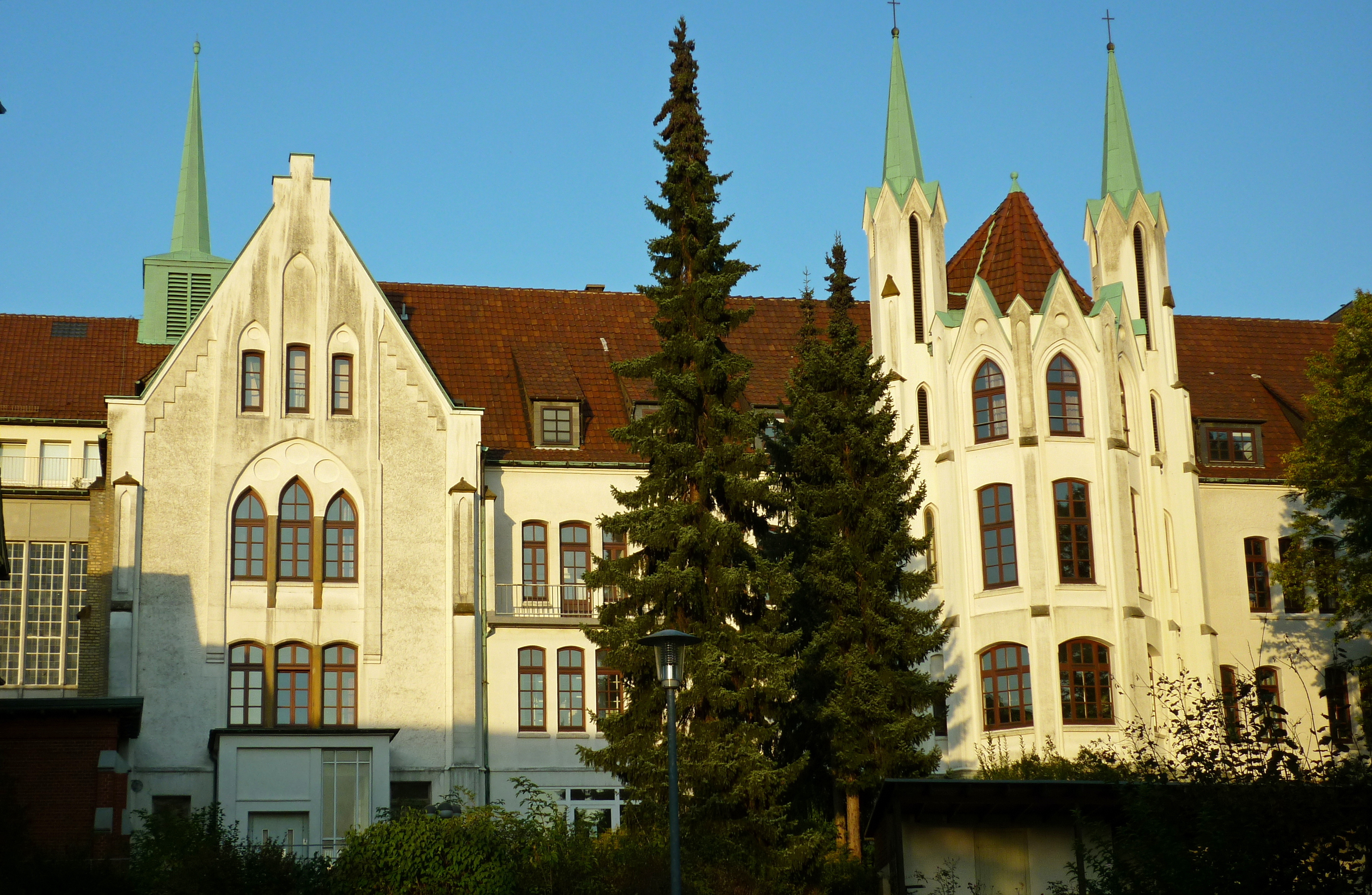
Deaconesses Sarepta Mother-House, built 1872–1875

The healthcare foundation was established in 1867 as Evangelische Heil- und Pflegeanstalt für Epileptische (Protestant institute of healing and care for epileptics) in Gadderbaum, today a district of Bielefeld. In 1872 Pastor Friedrich von Bodelschwingh, Senior, a proponent of the inner mission within the then Evangelical State Church in Prussia became its director. He massively strengthened and extended the institution, with more premises also for the poor and at other locations, and renamed it after Bethel in 1874. The name Bethel was also started being used for the neighbourhood, which developed outside the hospital. Later Bodelschwingh's name was compounded to the institution's name. In 1910 Bodelschwingh, Senior, died and the leadership passed on to his son Friedrich von Bodelschwingh, Junior, who led the institution until his death in 1946.

The institution is notable for its resistance against the Nazi Germany era. In August 1933, some six months after Hitler had become Reich Chancellor, Pastor Bodelschwingh, Junior, met with Dietrich Bonhoeffer and a few others to draft a new confession of faith, clarifying the grounds for resisting the Nazification of Germany, the Bethel Confession (Betheler Bekenntnis). The resulting document, the Barmen Declaration, was an early form of resistance to Hitler, a rejection of Christian anti-Judaism and racist anti-Semitism, though in practical terms it did nothing to impede the Nazis. During the course of the T-4 Euthanasia Program, which ran in 1940 and 1941 and was aimed at exterminating physically and mentally disabled people, the staff at the institution were mainly in opposition to that crime of the National Socialist party. In 1940, Adolf Hitler ordered the gassing of all mental patients. The director of the hospital, pastor Bodelschwingh, Junior, resisted.

You can put me into a concentration camp if you want, that is your affair. But as long as I am free, you do not touch one of my patients. I cannot change to fit the times or the wishes of the Führer. I stand under orders from our Lord Jesus Christ.

— Pastor Bodelschwingh, Junior

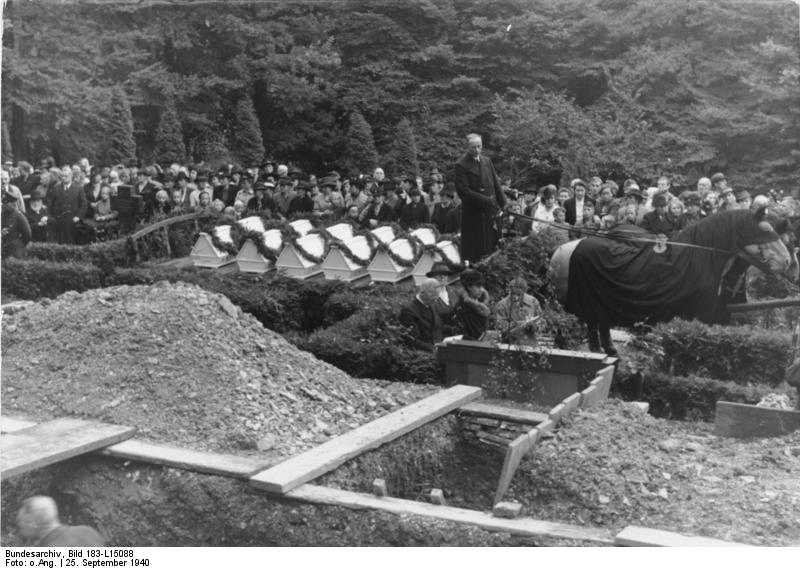
Bethel Cemetery, 25 September 1940: Burial of the Bethel casualties of the air raid

Parts of the hospitals were destroyed in a British Royal Air Force air raid in 1940. In religious respect the Bethel Institution is related to the Evangelical Church of Westphalia, the Westphalian regional successor of the old-Prussian Church. In 1946 Bodelschwingh, Junior, died and Friedrich von Bodelschwingh (1902–1977), nephew of Bodelschwingh, Junior, and grandson of the Senior, started managing the part of the Bethel Institution located at Gadderbaum, serving as the general director of all the Bethel Institutions between 1959 and 1969. The Bethel Institution is currently still being used as a mental hospital.
