= Critchfield, Indiana =

- Unincorporated community
- Location within Indiana Location within the United States
- Coordinates: 39°36′01″N 86°09′48″W
- Country: United States
- State: Indiana
- County: Johnson
- Township: White River
- Elevation: 771 ft (235 m)
- ZIP code: 46143
- FIPS code: 18-15940
- GNIS feature ID: 433136

Critchfield is an unincorporated community in White River Township, Johnson County, Indiana.
