= Richard Critchfield =

Richard Patrick Critchfield (March 23, 1931 – December 10, 1994) was an American journalist and essayist who wrote principally about agricultural village life in developing countries.

== Career ==
Richard Critchfield was born in Minneapolis and grew up in North Dakota, the son of a country doctor. His older brother, James H. Critchfield, became the chief of the Near East and South Asia division of the US Central Intelligence Agency. Richard Critchfield graduated from the University of Washington, and earned a master's degree in journalism at Columbia University. He did additional graduate work at the Universities of Vienna and Innsbruck, as well as Northwestern University.

Critchfield served in the U.S. Army during the Korean War, and then began his writing career as farm editor of the Cedar Rapids [Iowa] Gazette. He served as a war reporter in the Vietnam War for four years for the Washington Star, and wrote for that newspaper for about a decade, as a member of its editorial staff. After leaving the Washington Star, he became a freelance foreign correspondent on the Third World, writing for numerous publications including The Economist, The International Herald-Tribune, The Washington Post, and The Christian Science Monitor.

Critchfield published about ten books on a variety of topics, particularly villages in developing countries, but also including his Great Plains family history and Great Britain. Most notable among his books was Villages, published in 1981 and described thirteen years later as "a classic study of the forces eroding small towns." Villages was based on his having "studied 18 villages in 13 countries of Asia, Africa, and Latin America," and lived in those villages for long periods, "doing whatever was the dominant mode of earning a living."

Critchfield described his form of writing as "village reporting." In the words of his New York Times obituary, he "lived and worked among villagers of the third world to tell their story to Western readers," often addressing changes in traditional ways of life.

Critchfield believed that the U.S. defeat in Vietnam "was not a failure of power, but a failure of knowledge," that is, the result of a U.S. lack of understanding "the ordinary Vietnamese peasant out in his village and ... his Confucian culture."

In a 1980 article he argued, presciently, that agriculture in the Soviet Union was failing (among other reasons, "the Russians can blame Marxism-Leninism for their farming failure"), while Chinese agriculture was succeeding (where the Great Leap Forward to collective agriculture "proved such a fiasco that the Chinese made a brisk retreat back toward the family farm").

He died in 1994 in Washington, D.C., after suffering a stroke; he was there for a party to celebrate the publication of his last book, The Villagers, a follow-up to Villages.

Critchfield won significant honors. In 1965, he won an Overseas Press Club award for his reporting from Vietnam. He was awarded an Alice Patterson Fellowship in 1970 to report on the topic "Food Population Crisis in India, Indonesia and Iran." He was chosen as a MacArthur Fellow in December 1981, the first year of that "genius grant" program, and accordingly awarded a $244,000 grant.

On the other hand, Columbia professor of Middle Eastern Studies Timothy Mitchell has vocally criticized Critchfield, arguing that Critchfield's writing on Egypt plagiarized from older and uninformed sources, and was disingenuous or inaccurate in its descriptions of Egyptian life. Mitchell further asserts that Critchfield's work supported, and was in turn supported by, the U.S. academic and foreign policy establishment, noting that it was partly financed by the Ford Foundation, the Rockefeller Foundation, and the U.S. Agency for International Development; that his brother was an early and senior CIA employee; that many of the sites of his reporting, such as Vietnam, Mauritius, and Egypt, were significant to U.S. foreign policy; and that he was on friendly terms with Robert McNamara and "other figures associated with the CIA and the politico-military establishment."

== Publications ==
=== Books ===
- The Indian Reporter's Guide (1962)
- The Long Charade: Political Subversion in the Vietnam War (1968)
- Lore and Legend of Nepal (1971)
- The Golden Bowl Be Broken: Peasant Life in Four Cultures (1973 and 1988)
- Shahhat: An Egyptian (1978)
- Villages. Anchor Books. 1981. ISBN 978-0-385-17212-7.
- Those Days: An American Album (1986)
- An American looks at Britain. Doubleday. 1990. ISBN 978-0385244572.
- Trees, why do you wait?: America's changing rural culture. Island Press. 1991. ISBN 978-1-55963-028-3.
- The Villagers: Changed Values, Altered Lives: The Closing of the Urban-Rural Gap. Anchor Books. 1994. ISBN 978-0-385-42050-1.

=== Articles (some) ===
- "The Alicia Patterson Foundation Newsletters of Richard Critchfield"
- "The New Environment of Foreign Aid", The Nation, May 15, 1972
- "Why Soviet Breadbasket is Never Full", Christian Science Monitor, April 22, 1980
- "Science and the Villager: The Last Sleeper Wakes", Foreign Affairs, Fall 1982
- "The Village Voice of Richard Critchfield: Bringing the Third World to the Fourth Estate", Washington Journalism Review, October 1985
