= Friedrich von Bodelschwingh =

German theologian (1877–1946)

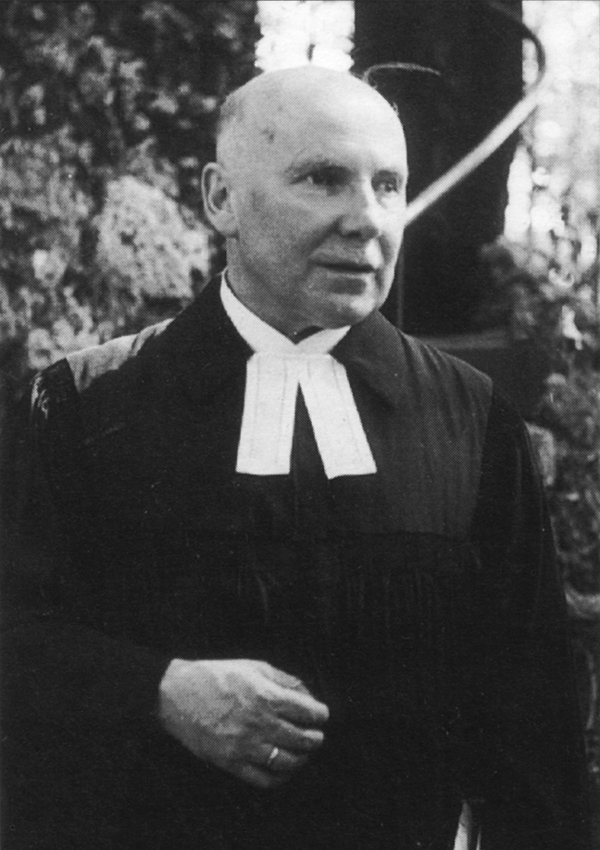
Friedrich von Bodelschwingh the Younger

Friedrich "Fritz" von Bodelschwingh (German: [ˈfʁiːdʁɪç fɔn ˈboːdl̩ʃvɪŋ]; 14 August 1877 Bethel – 4 January 1946 Bethel), also known as Friedrich von Bodelschwingh the Younger, was a German pastor, theologian and public health advocate. His father was Friedrich von Bodelschwingh the Elder (6 March 1831, Tecklenburg – 2 April 1910, Bethel), founder of the v. Bodelschwinghsche Anstalten Bethel charitable foundations.

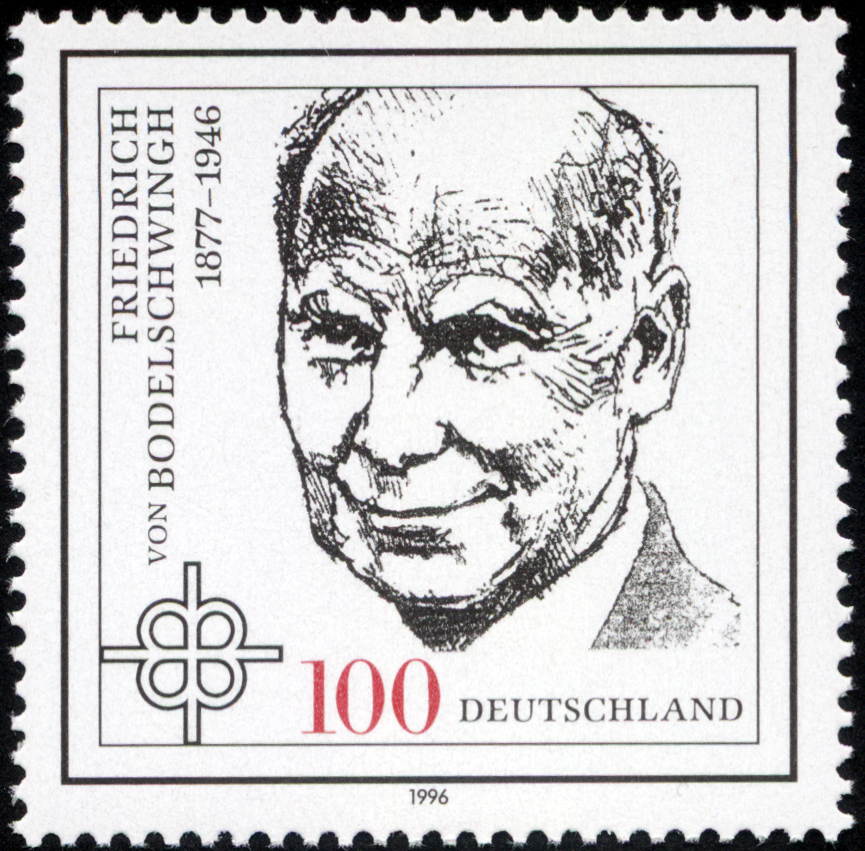
Friedrich von Bodelschwingh on a 1996 stamp.

== Public health activities ==
Friedrich was the son of Reverend Friedrich Christian Carl von Bodelschwingh and his wife Ida Friederize Caroline Luise Wilhelmine von Bodelschwingh. He is sometimes known as Friedrich von Bodelschwingh the Younger to distinguish him from his father. Reverend Friedrich von Bodelschwingh began and operated the von Bodelschwingh Bethel Institution, which offers health care and other advantages to the poor, for many years. Upon the death of his father in 1910, Bodelschwingh the younger took over their operation. Both he and his father were close friends and colleagues of Ernst von Dobschütz. In 1921 he expanded the services of the Institute to care for orphaned children; boys who did not know their birthdate were given March 6, in honor of Reverend von Bodelschwingh, and girls were given February 20 in honor of Frieda von Bodelschwingh.

Both Bodelschwinghs were concerned with inherited defects, and expressed distress at the increasing number of handicapped persons in Germany. In a speech on 29 January 1929 he referred to the "catastrophic development" of "the increasing number of weak ones in body and spirit."

== Reich bishop in the commencing Struggle of the Churches ==
After its takeover of power the Nazi Reich's government aimed at streamlining the Protestant regional church bodies, recognising the Faith Movement of the German Christians (German: Glaubensbewegung Deutsche Christen, DC) as its means to do so (see Struggle of the Churches, German: Kirchenkampf). On 4 and 5 April 1933 representatives of the German Christians convened in Berlin and demanded the dismissal of all members of the executive bodies of the then 28 Protestant regional church bodies in Germany, then rather loosely associated with each other in the Deutscher Evangelischer Kirchenbund (German Protestant Church Confederation). The German Christians demanded their ultimate merger into a uniform Protestant Reich Church, to be named German Protestant Church (German: Deutsche Evangelische Kirche), led according to the Nazi Führerprinzip by a Reich's Bishop (German: Reichsbischof), abolishing all democratic participation of parishioners in presbyteries and synods. The German Christians announced the appointment of a Reich's Bishop for 31 October 1933, the highly symbolic Reformation Day public holiday.

In a mood of an emergency through an impending Nazi takeover functionaries of the then officiating executive bodies of the 28 Protestant regional church bodies stole a march on the German Christians. Functionaries and activists worked hastily on negotiating between the 28 Protestant regional church bodies a legally indoubtable unification. On 25 April 1933 three men convened, Hermann Kapler, president of the old-Prussian Evangelical Supreme Church Council – representing United Protestantism –, August Marahrens, state bishop of the Evangelical Lutheran State Church of Hanover (for the Lutherans), and the Reformed Hermann-Albert Hesse, director of the preacher seminary in Wuppertal, to prepare the constitution of a united church which they called the German Protestant Church too. This caused the later confusion when the streamlined Reich church and the Confessing Church alike identified as being the legitimate church of that name. The Nazi government compelled the negotiators to include its representative, the former army chaplain Ludwig Müller, a devout German Christian, betting on his prevalence. The plans were to dissolve the German Evangelical Church Confederation and the 28 church regional bodies and to replace them by a uniform Protestant Reich church.

On 27 May 1933 representatives of the 28 church bodies gathered in Berlin and against a minority, voting for Ludwig Müller, Friedrich von Bodelschwingh, Jr., a member of the Evangelical Church of the old-Prussian Union, was elected Reich's Bishop, a newly created title. The German Christians strictly opposed that election, because Bodelschwingh was not their partisan. Thus the Nazis, who were permanently breaking the law, stepped in, using the competent streamlined Prussian government led by Hermann Göring, and declared the functionaries had exceeded their authority.

Once the Nazi government had figured out that the Protestant church bodies would not be streamlined from within using the German Christians, they abolished the constitutional freedom of religion and religious organisation, declaring the election of Bodelschwingh had created a situation contravening the constitutions of the Protestant regional churches, and on these grounds, on 24 June the Nazi Minister of Cultural Affairs, Bernhard Rust appointed August Jäger as Prussian State Commissioner for the Prussian ecclesiastical affairs (German: Staatskommissar für die preußischen kirchlichen Angelegenheiten).

This act clearly violated the status of the Protestant regional churches as statutory bodies (German: Körperschaften des öffentlichen Rechts), subjecting them to Jäger's orders. Bodelschwingh resigned as Reich's Bishop the same day. On 28 June Jäger appointed Müller as new Reich's Bishop and on 6 July as leader of the Evangelical Church of the old-Prussian Union.

== Opposition to other Nazi policies ==
Bodelschwingh discussed both euthanasia and enforced sterilisation as possible solutions to the problem but concluded by firmly rejecting euthanasia as a viable option which put him at odds with the Nazi regime. Although he took the oath of loyalty to Hitler in 1938, as was common for Protestant pastors in the Third Reich, he made no secret of his vigorous opposition to the Nazis' sterilisation and euthanasia policies. The Gestapo closed the Bethel Theological School in March 1939 and in April 1940 ordered institutions and homes to begin relocation of their patients in collective shipments without notification of next-of-kin.

In May 1940 Pastor Paul Braune, Vice President of the Central Board for Inner Missions of the German Protestant churches and head of the Hoffnungstal Institutions, met with Bodelschwingh at Bethel to discuss the Nazi "green forms" which he had been instructed to fill out, authorising the transfer of "feebleminded" girls from the Hoffnungstal Institutions. The two men were deeply alarmed over disturbing reports of deaths of former patients who were shipped off and strange obituaries which had appeared. In February 1941 when a physician's commission arrived at Bethel to force Bodelschwingh to fill out the green forms, he refused. Staff members expressed their willingness to forcibly resist any attempted transportation of sick persons by force and the commission eventually departed. A month later the Nazi regime banned the institute press.

On 21 September 1940, war correspondent William Shirer recorded in his Berlin Diary (Boston: Little, Brown and Co., 1941) that "X" had told him "a weird story." He had said that the Gestapo was "systematically bumping off" the mentally deficient people of the Reich and that the Nazis were calling them “mercy deaths.” According to X, Pastor Bodelschwingh, the head of a large hospital for different kinds of feeble-minded children in Bethel, had been arrested because he had refused to turn over some of his more serious mental cases to the secret police. Not long afterwards, his hospital was bombed by the “British" (p. 512). On 25 November 1940, Shirer wrote that it seemed that after having refused to turn over his patients to the authorities, Bodelschwingh had protested through a surgeon friend to Hitler, who said that nothing could be done. Then the two men contacted the Minister of Justice, who agreed to complain to Hitler about the matter. When Bodelschwingh returned to Bethel, the Gauleiter ordered him to deliver certain of his patients. He refused once again. Berlin therefore ordered his arrest. However, the Gauleiter refused to arrest him, arguing that he was the most popular man in his province and that to arrest him would cause a great deal of unnecessary trouble in time of war. The Bethel asylum was bombed shortly thereafter (pp. 569–70).

According to the noted psychiatrist Karl Stern's memoir, The Pillar of Fire (p. 119), "There was a famous Lutheran pastor, Bodelschwingh, who built up a huge colony of feeble-minded, idiots and epileptics in Bethel in Western Germany. During the war, when the Nazis carried out the slaughter of all mental patients, Pastor Bodelschwingh insisted that he would be killed together with his inmates. It was only on the basis of his international fame that the politicians let him get away with it, and let him and the inmates of his colony live. This was a kind of last-ditch stand of Christianity."

== Death and posthumous recognitions ==
After the war, Bodelschwingh and the Bethel Institute set up the Bethel Search Service to help locate missing family members. Bodelschwingh died in January 1946 and was buried in the Zions Church in Bethel.

Friedrich von Bodelschwingh appeared three times on German postage stamps: in 1967 when the German Federal post office commemorated the 100th anniversary of the Bethel hospitals, in 1977 to commemorate Bodelschwingh's 100th birthday, and in 1996 to commemorate the 50th anniversary of his death.

== Von Bodelschwingh Foundations today ==
The von Bodelschwingh Foundations of Bethel are still in operation, helping more than 14,000 persons in clinics, homes, schools, kindergartens, live-in groups, work therapy facilities and shops for the disabled.

== Literature ==
- Alfred Adam (1955). "Bodelschwingh, Friedrich". Neue Deutsche Biographie (in German). Vol. 2. Berlin: Duncker & Humblot. pp. 351–352. (full text online).
- Friedrich Wilhelm Bautz (1975). "Bodelschwingh, Friedrich von". In Bautz, Friedrich Wilhelm (ed.). Biographisch-Bibliographisches Kirchenlexikon (BBKL) (in German). Vol. 1. Hamm: Bautz. col. 649–651. ISBN 3-88309-013-1.
- Benad, Matthias: "Bethels Verhältnis zum Nationalsozialismus", in: ders./ Regina Mentner (Hg.), Zwangsverpflichtet. Kriegsgefangene und zivile Zwangsarbeiter in Bethel und Lobetal 1939–1945, Bielefeld 2002, S. 27-66.
- Hochmuth, Anneliese: Spurensuche. Eugenik, Sterilisation, Patientenmorde und die v. Bodelschwinghschen Anstalten Bethel 1929–1945, Bielefeld 1997.
- Ernst Klee: „Euthanasie“ im NS-Staat. Die „Vernichtung lebensunwerten Lebens“. S. Fischer Verlag, Frankfurt am Main 1983, ISBN 3-10-039303-1.
