= Pellenz =

Region in Germany

Coordinates: 50°23′N 7°21′E

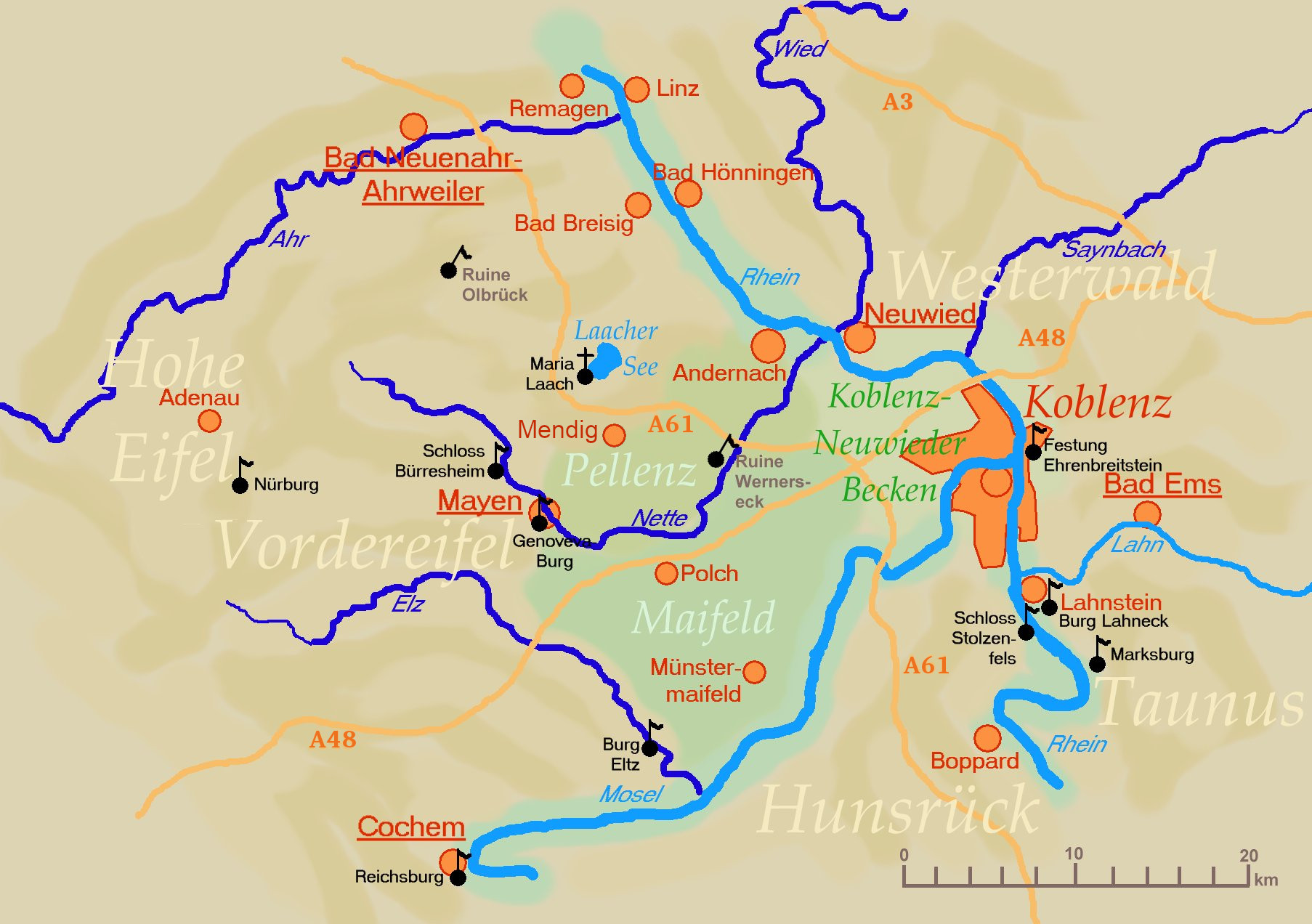
Map

The Pellenz is a hill country in the northwestern part of the Middle Rhine Basin in Germany between Mayen in the southwest and Andernach in the northeast. In addition Pellenz is the name of a Verbandsgemeinde in the state of Rhineland-Palatinate, which covers the north of the landscape of Pellenz and has had its seat since May 2017 in the village of Plaidt (prior to that it was run from Andernach).

== Geography ==
The settlements of the Pellenz comprise the mainly industrial villages of Ochtendung, Kruft, Nickenich, Plaidt, and Kretz (Pellenz Volcanoes or Pellenzvulkane, east) and Niedermendig (today Mendig), Kottenheim, Thür (Pellenz Basin or Pellenzsenke, west) and the Polch which projects into the region of Maifeld (Pellenz Heights or Pellenzhöhe, south). The region lies alongside the A 61 and A 48 motorways and the Pellenz-Eifel Railway.

The little river of the Nette flows through the rolling countryside which descends gently from west to east towards the Rhine. Most of its striking volcanic kuppen have been quarried. The river bounds the region in places with the Maifeld lying to the south.

== Natural regions ==
The Pellenz is divided as follows:

- (to 291 - Middle Rhine Basin)
  - (to 291.2 - Maifeld-Pellenz Hills)
    - 291.22 Pellenz
    - 291.220 Pellenz Volcanoes (east)
      - Ochtendung, Kruft, Nickenich and Kretz
    - 291.221 Pellenz Basin (west)
      - Mendig, Kottenheim, Thür
    - 291.222 Pellenz Heights (foothills in the south)
      - Polch
