= Maifeld =

German landscape

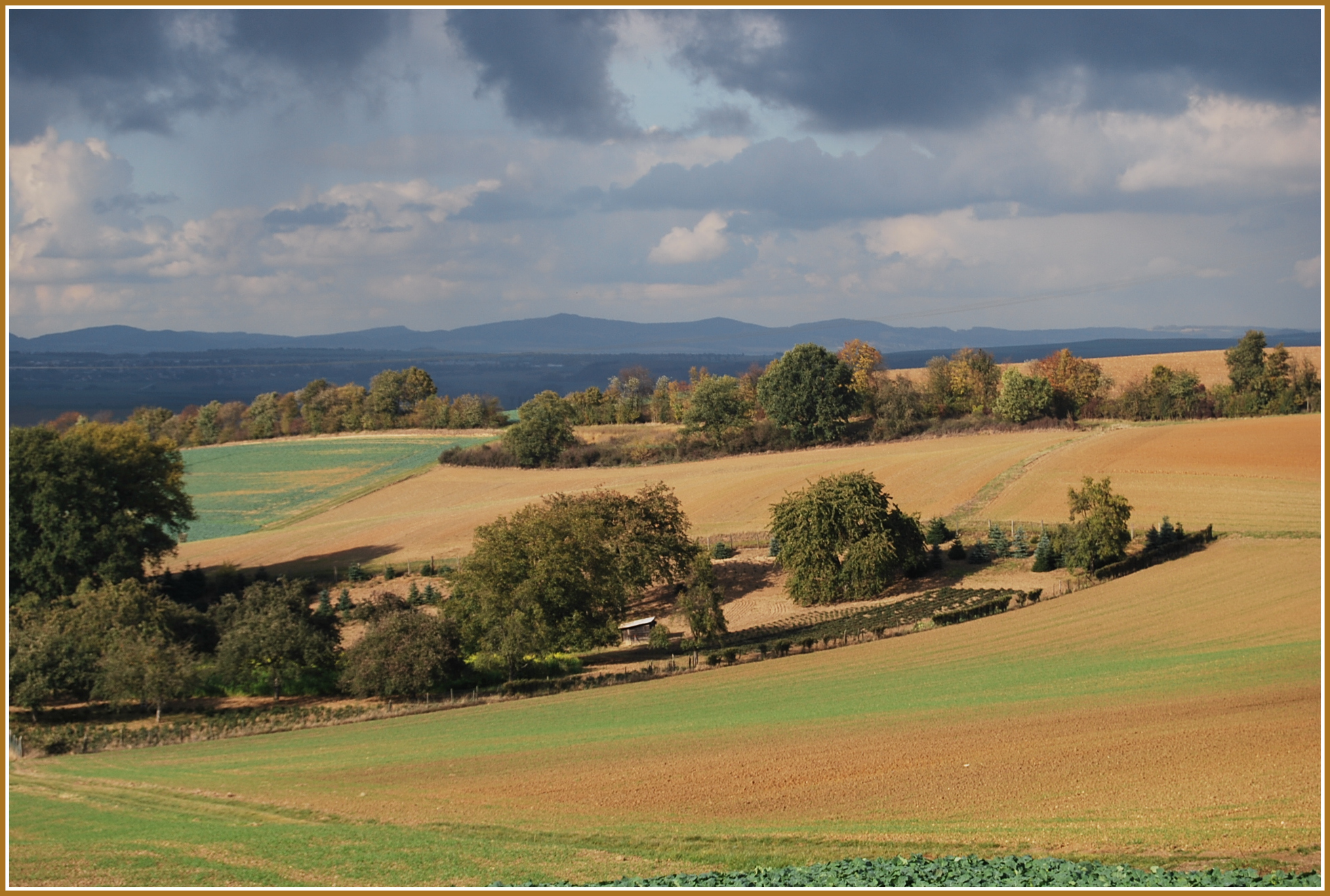
The Maifeld

The Maifeld (German pronunciation: [ˈmaɪfɛlt]) is a landscape (a natural region sub-unit) of the Middle Rhine Basin on its western perimeter with the Eifel mountains, southwest of the city of Koblenz. It is known for its gently rolling hills.

== Location ==
The plain, which lies at about 400 metres above sea level, is divided into the Upper Maifeld (Obermaifeld) south of Mayen in the west, and the rather larger Lower Maifeld (Niedermaifeld) area which adjoins it to the east, southwest of Koblenz. It is comparatively sharply bounded by the rivers Moselle (southeast) and Elz (southwest), while the River Nette in the northwest only forms an approximate boundary.

Its name is probably derived from the Franks, who held assemblies here.

== Use ==
The Maifeld is almost exclusively used for large-scale grain production. Only a few large farms, which are often hidden between the undulating fields, manage this region. The soils are especially fertile. Towns in the Maifeld are Polch (seat of the Verbandsgemeinde of Maifeld in the county of Mayen-Koblenz, but strictly in the Pellenz (Pellenzhöhe) from a natural regional perspective) and Münstermaifeld.

== Natural regions ==
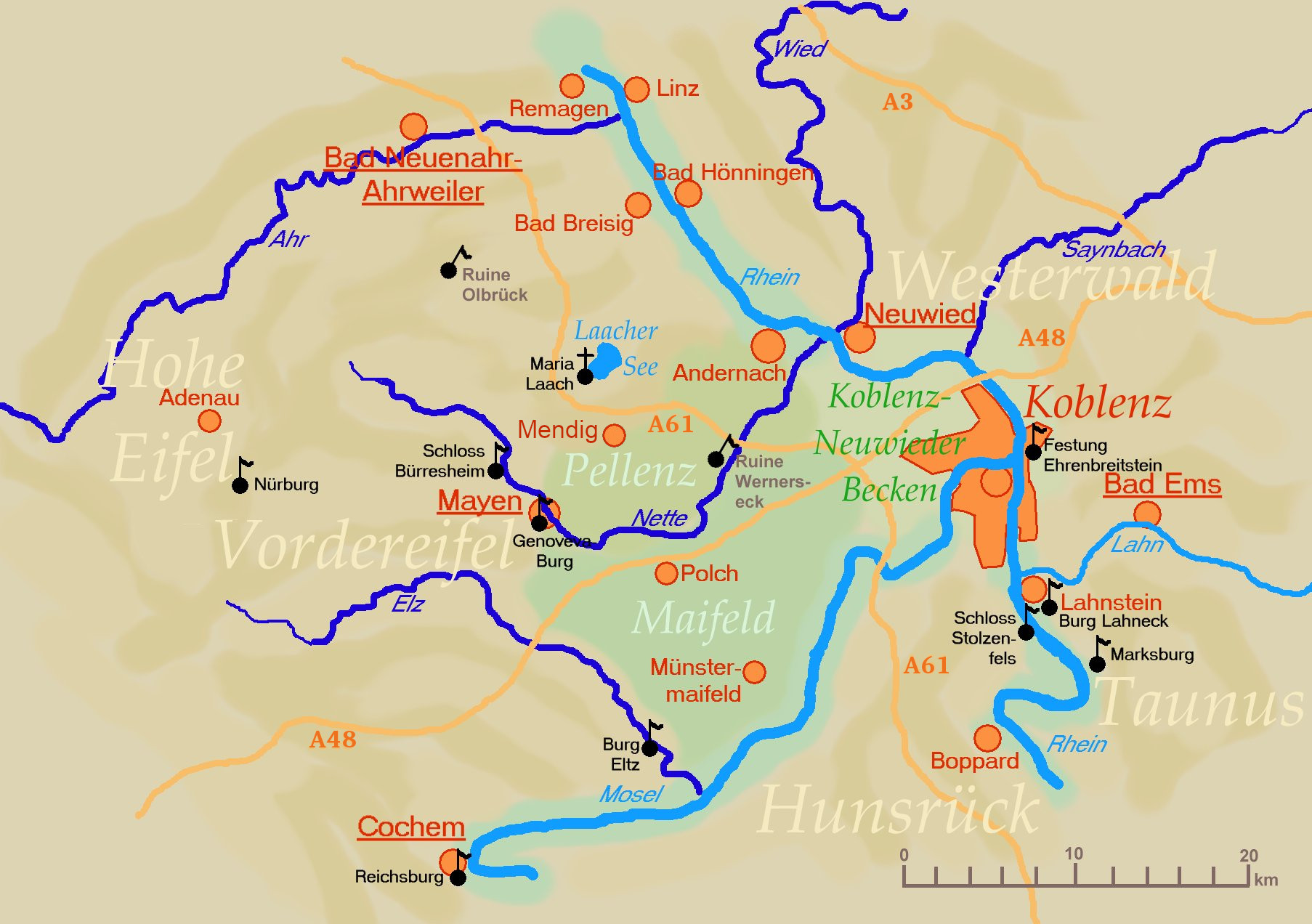
Map

The Maifeld is divided as follows:

- (to 291 – Middle Rhine Basin)
  - (to 291.2 – Maifeld-Pellenz Hills)
    - 291.23 Lower Maifeld (east)
      - 291.230 Lower Maifeld Basin
      - 291.231 Lower Maifeld Terrace
      - 291.232 Lower Maifeld Heights
    - 291.24 Upper Maifeld (west)

== Sights ==
- Eltz Castle in the Elz valley
- Karmelenberg
- Church of St. Martin and St. Severus
- Maifeld Cycleway (former Mayen–Polch–Ochtendung / Polch–Münstermaifeld railway line)
