= Wernerseck Castle =

- Kelterhausburg
- Ochtendung
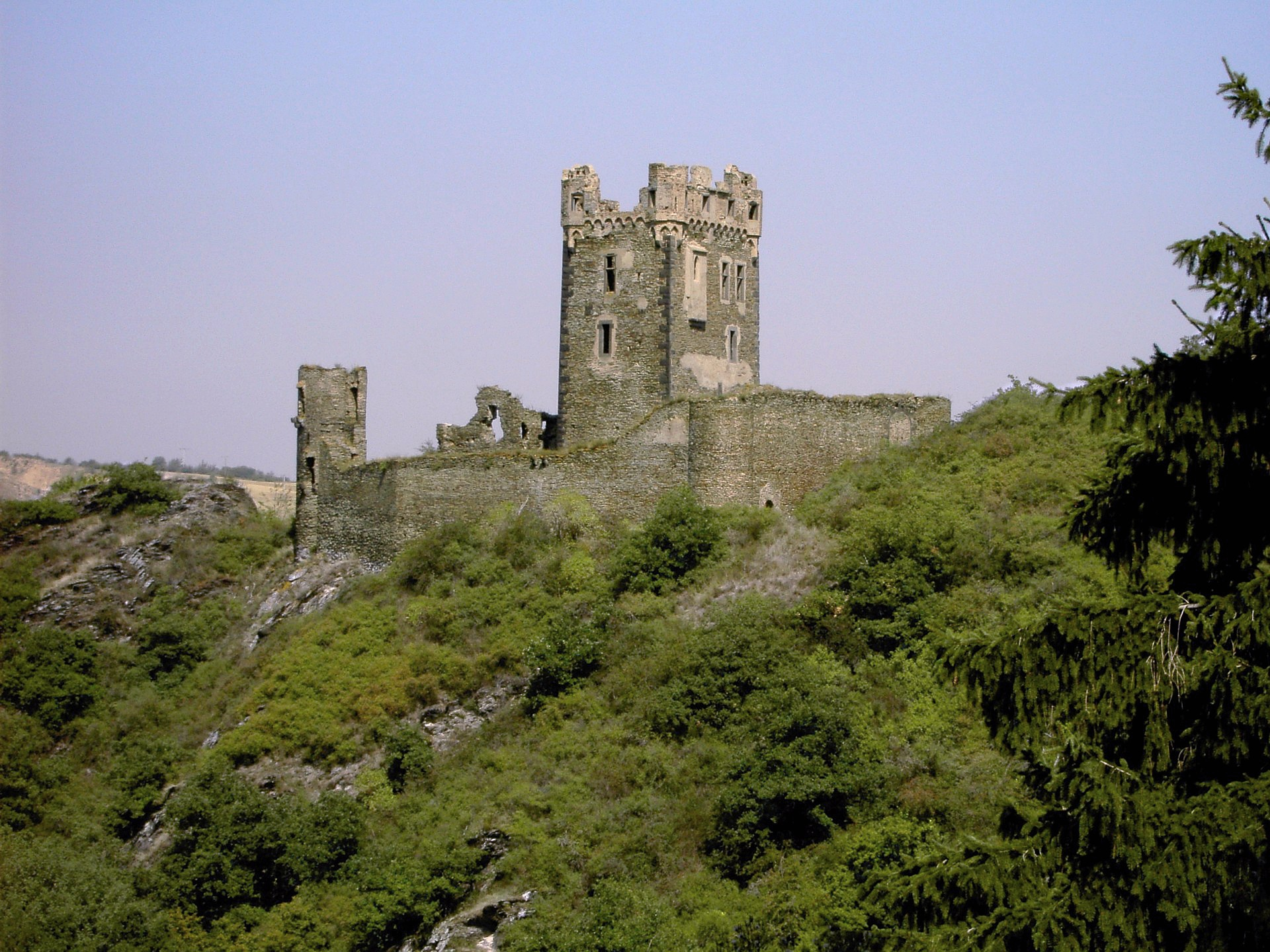
- Wernerseck Castle

Site information
- Type: hill castle
- Code: DE-RP
- Condition: ruins, largely preserved

Location
- Coordinates: 50°22′21″N 7°22′41″E
- Height: 154 m above sea level (NHN)

Site history
- Built: 1402
- Materials: basalt and slate

Wernerseck Castle (German: Burg Wernerseck), also called the Kelterhausburg, is a late medieval hill castle in the municipality of Ochtendung in the county of Mayen-Koblenz in the German state of Rhineland-Palatinate. It owes its name to its founder and lord of the castle, the Archbishop of Trier, Werner of Falkenstein (1388–1418). "Wernerseck" means "Werner's corner".

== Location ==
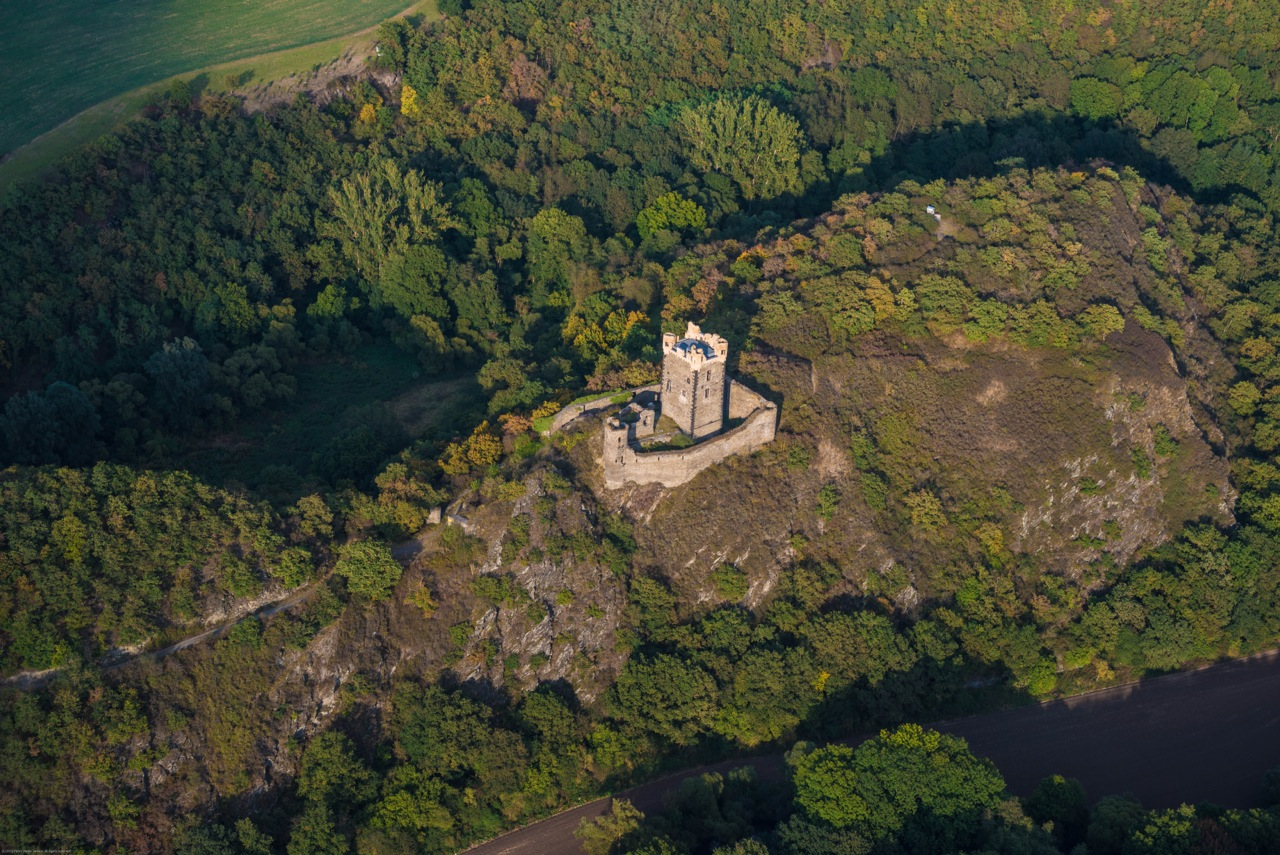
September 2012 aerial photograph

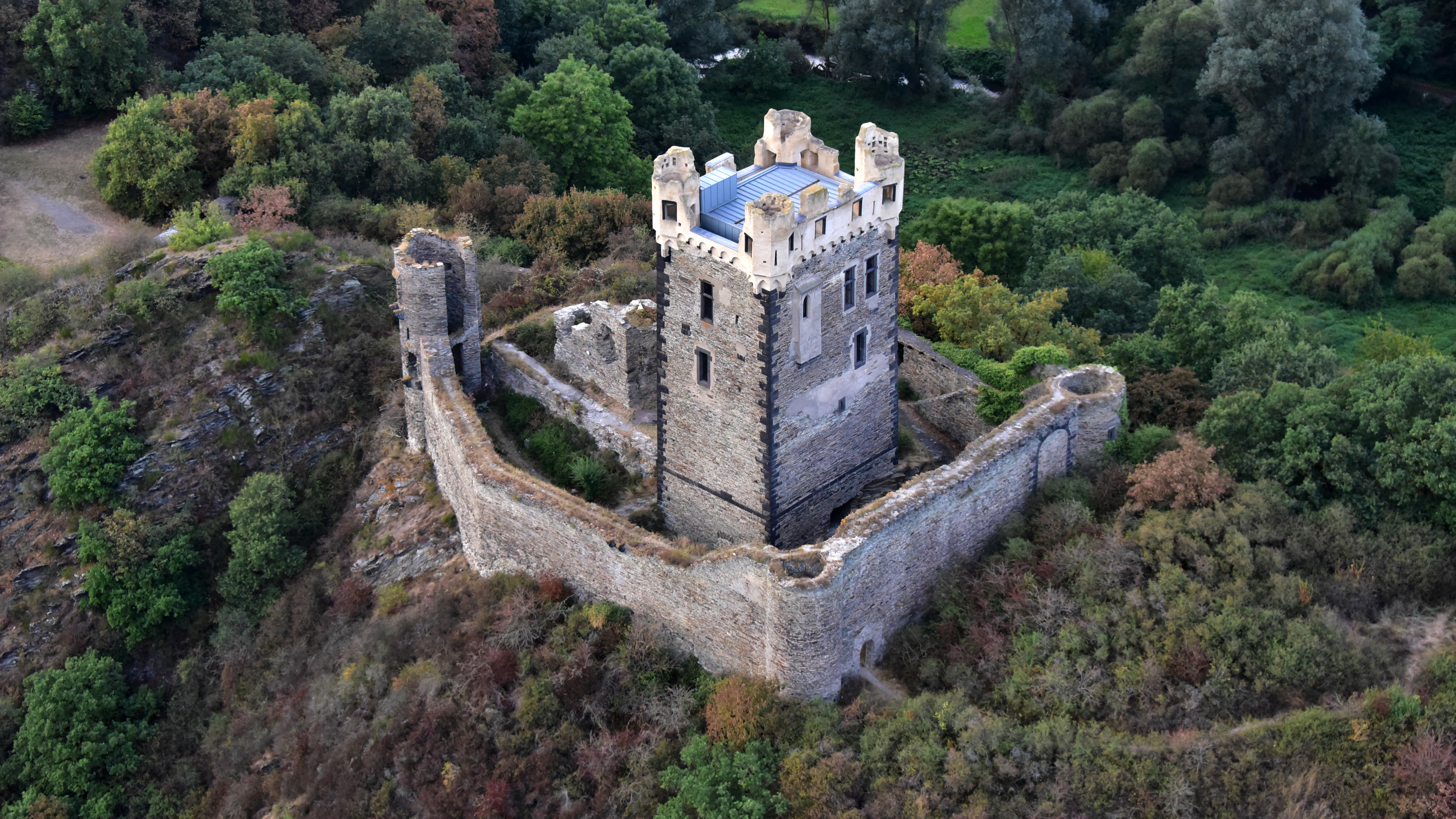
Wernerseck Castle, 2016 aerial photograph

The ruins of the hill castle are situated above the River Nette at the foot of the Eifel mountains in the immediate vicinity of the Plaidt junction on the A 61 motorway. In the eastern part of the hill spur, on the narrowest part of which the castle was built, there was a Roman fortification in the Late Antiquity. The origin of this defensive position, which was probably conceived as a refuge fort, has been dated by coin finds to the first half of the 4th century. On the basis of pottery finds, it is assumed that the fort was used until the early 5th century. Similar sites from the Late Antiquity along the Nette are found at Welling, Ruitsch and on the Katzenberg near Mayen.

== History ==
The Trier prince-elector and archbishop, Werner of Falkenstein, began building the castle in late 1401 as part of his expansion policy in the Pellenz area. Thus, the site was not in the district of Ochtendung, which belonged to Electoral Trier, but in the feudal area of the counts of Virneburg. The castle was intended to act as a border fortress, guarding it against the principality of the Archbishop of Cologne. However, the castle never fulfilled this purpose, as the borders were realigned whilst it was being built. Later the castle was used as an administrative centre. Conrad Colbe of Boppard was probably appointed as the first Amtmann (bailiff) in 1412. From the 16th century onwards, the castle was enfeoffed to the lords of Eltz, who owned it until the 19th century. From 1966 to 1969 there was a falconry at the castle. A preservation society has set itself the task of securing and renovating the dilapidated castle and, between summer 2006 and November 2007, the tower house was renovated.

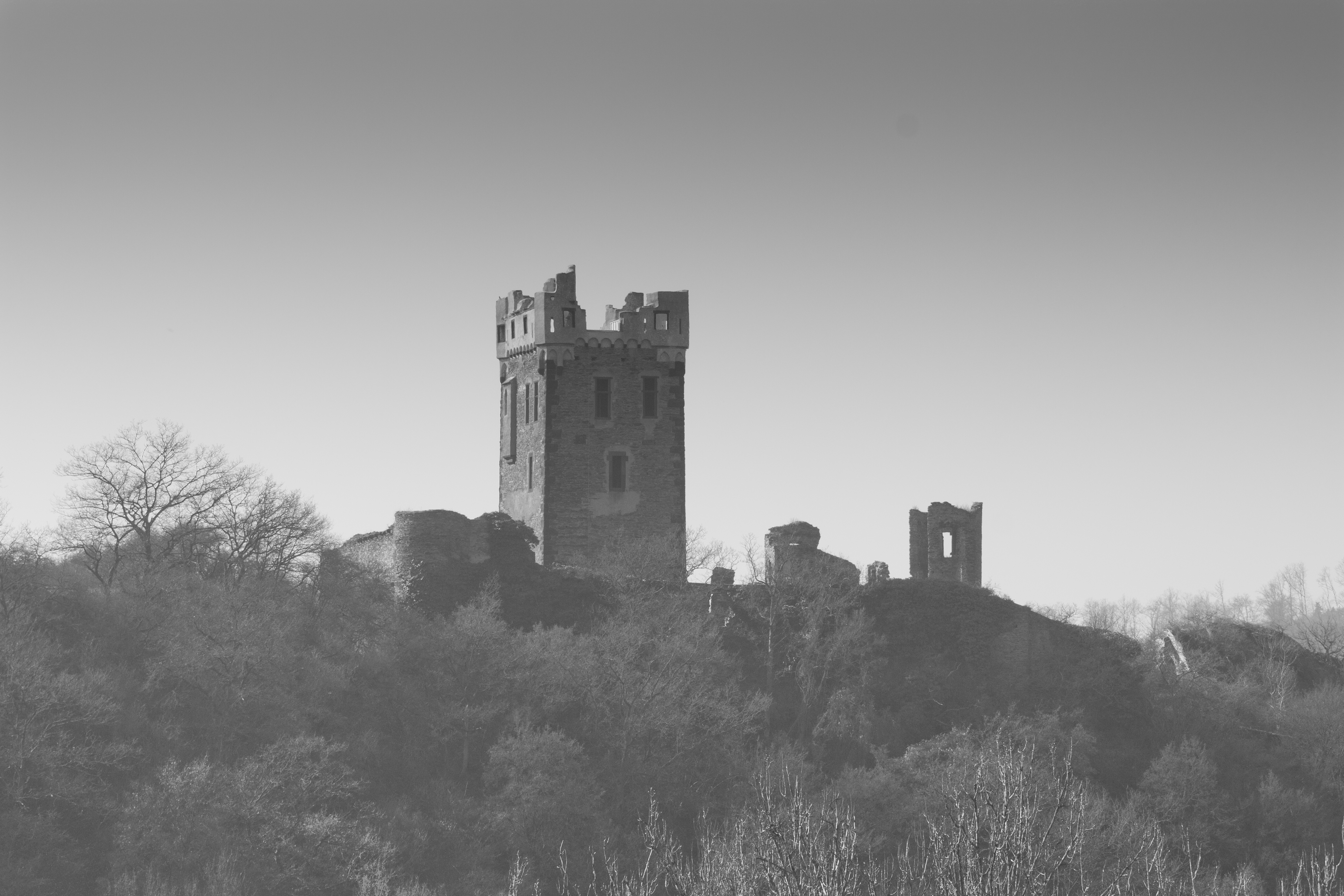
The ruins

== Layout ==
The pentagonal castle has round towers at three corners, whilst another corner forms the gate system. Its occupants lived in the 22-metre-high, four-storey, donjon (keep or tower house), which also had the normal function of a bergfried (fighting tower). It also contained the castle chapel. Access was via an elevated entrance. The tower house has unusually strong walls (2.5 metres thick) and its lower part has largely survived; the upper floors with their roof platform have become increasingly dilapidated and were repaired in 2007 by a preservation society. The castle is owned by the municipality of Ochtendung. It can be visited at any time, but can only be reached after a walk of about 2 km (from the town centre).

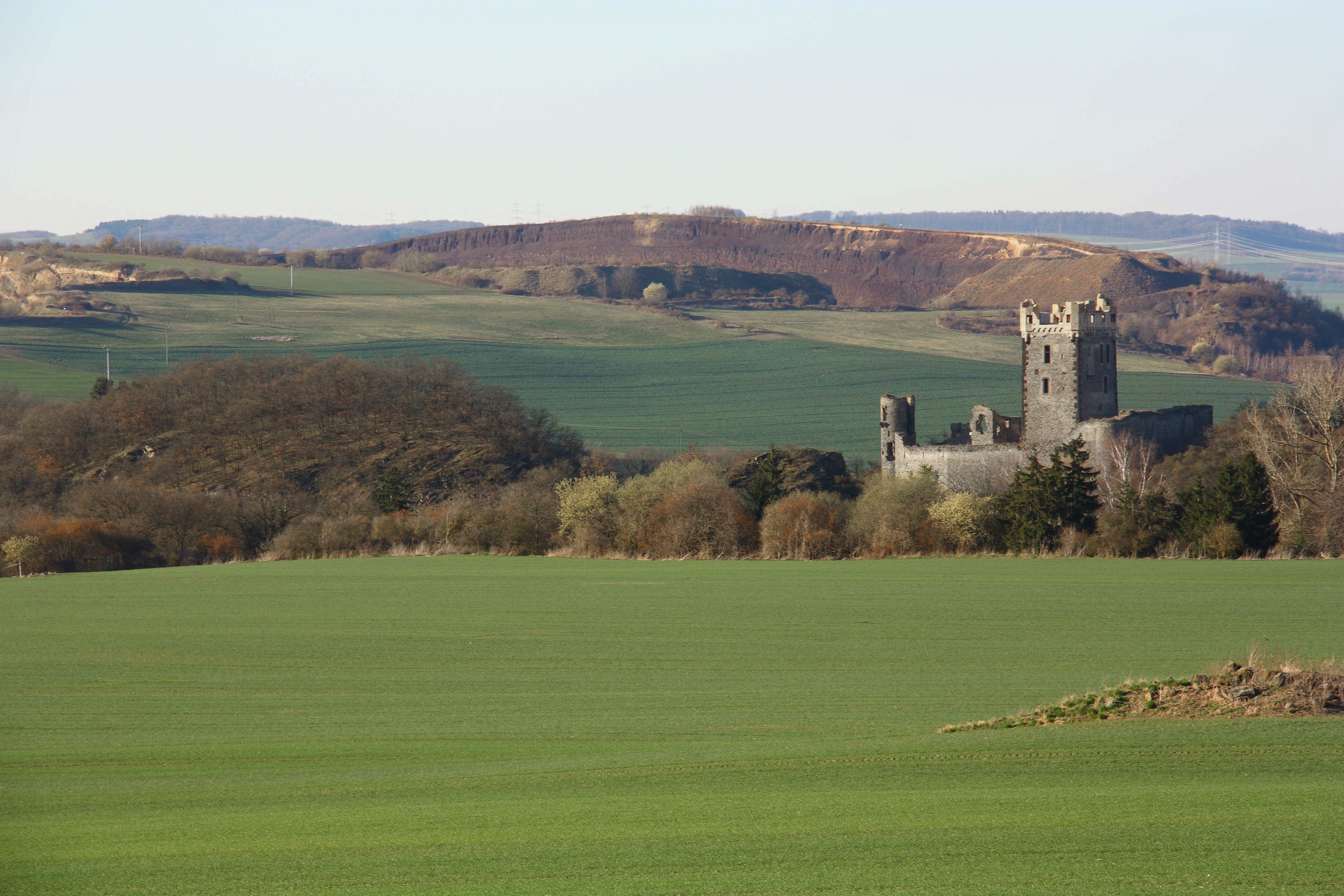
Eifel landscape

== Phases of construction ==
In the first construction phase at Wernerseck, the tower house was built as part of a simpleenceinte. The protruding bricks on the north side of the main tower, which used to join it firmly to a wall, can be seen as evidence of this. Furthermore, on the south and east side, there is a band of basalt stones in the brickwork, which could have been decoration on the outside of the castle. The curtain walls largely follow the line of the wall of the older, Ottonian castle, including its gateways. In a later extension, the surrounding wall was extended and provided with corner towers.

== Older castle remains ==
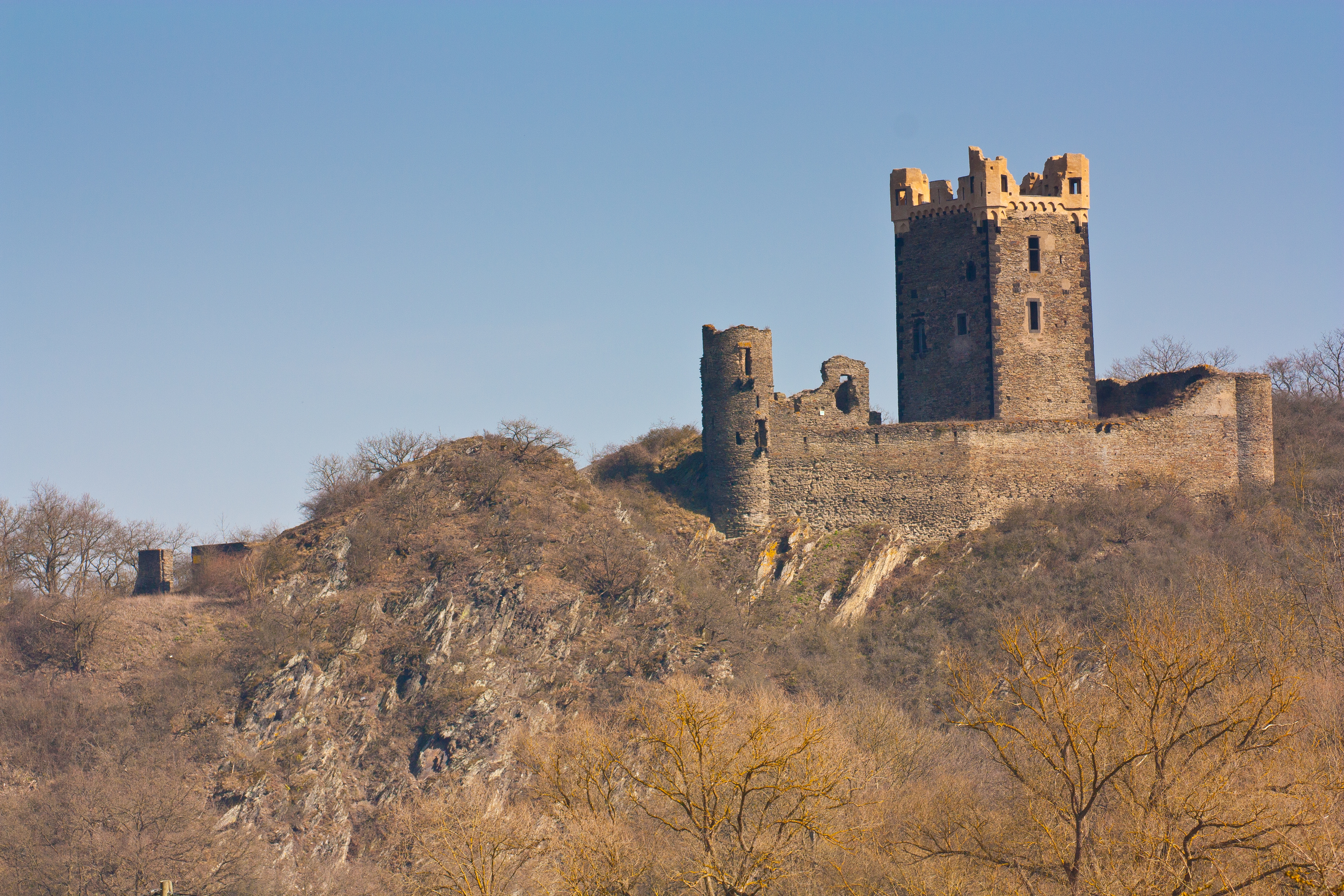
Wernerseck Castle

The remains of an older castle, which were used in the construction of Wernerseck, can be found in various parts of the castle and which have thus survived the ravages of time. The masonry at these points differs from that of the later castle in that smaller slate stone was employed. Particularly noteworthy are the half of a gate system next to the tower house, part of the later inner gateway, and the remains of a building in the centre of the castle. Its predecessor probably followed the uninterrupted rocky hillcrest at that time and included the plateau in the area of the later outer bailey. Since there are no definitively dateable finds from the time before the new castle was built, its date of construction can only be estimated from the structural evidence. In the inner gateway, the remains of an older gateway have survived that is almost identical to that of the Waldschlössel at Klingenmünster. This suggests that the original castle should be regarded as an Ottonian build of the 10th to 11th century. There are no written records of the old castle, but it is not unreasonable to attribute its construction to the counts palatine of Laach.

== Literature ==
- Günther Gries, Annette Lehnigk-Emden: Die Burg Wernerseck. In: Ochtendunger Heimatblätter. Published by the Ochtendung Local History Society (Heimatverein Ochtendung). Issue 4 (1993), pp. 3–18, Issue 5, (1994), pp. 19–30; Issue 6 (1995), pp. 19–21.
- Dieter Schmidt, Günther Gries, Annette Lehnigk-Emden: Burg Wernerseck, der Burgberg in prähistorischer, spätrömischer und mittelalterlicher Zeit. Ochtendunger Heimatblätter. Published by the Ochtendung Local History Society. Issue 11 (2001), ISSN 0938-1244.
- Bernhard Gondorf (1984), Die Burgen der Eifel und ihrer Randgebiete. Ein Lexikon der "festen Häuser" [The castles of the Eifel and its Environs. A dictionary of "fortified houses"] (in German), Cologne: J. P. Bachem, ISBN 3-7616-0723-7
- Alexander Thon, Stefan Ulrich: "... wie ein Monarch mitten in seinem Hofstaate thront". Burgen am unteren Mittelrhein. Schnell & Steiner, Regensburg, 2010, ISBN 978-3-7954-2210-3, pp. 156–161.
- Josef Busley und Heinrich Neu: Kunstdenkmäler des Kreises Mayen, L. Schwann, Düsseldorf, 1941, pp. 386–391.
- Achim Schmidt: Demarkationspunkt oder Bollwerk? – Baugeschichtliche Bemerkungen zur Burgruine Wernerseck bei Ochtendung, Landkreis Mayen-Koblenz. In: Olaf Wagener (ed.): Symbole der Macht – Aspekte mittelalterlicher und frühneuzeitlicher Architektur. (=Beihefte zur Mediaevistik. Vol. 17.) Frankfurt/Main, 2012, pp. 177–196.
