= Ettringer Bellerberg =

Mountain in Germany

- Location within Rhineland-Palatinate

Highest point
- Elevation: 427.5 m above sea level (NHN) (1,403 ft)
- Listing: – Bellerberg Volcano – Volcano Park
- Coordinates: 50°21′01″N 7°13′42″E

Geography
- Location: near Ettringen; Mayen-Koblenz, Rhineland-Palatinate (Germany)
- Parent range: Eifel

The Ettringer Bellerberg, also called the Ettringer Bellberg, is a hill, 427.5 m above sea level (NHN), forming the western flank of the Bellerberg Volcano, a volcano system that was active about 200,000 years ago.

== Geography ==
=== Location ===
The Ettringer Bellerberg rises in the southern part of the municipality of Ettringen. Its summit is 800 metres southeast of the centre of Ettringen village, 2 km west of Kottenheim and 2.3 km north-northeast of Mayen in the East Eifel. Roughly southwest of the hill is the River Nette and to the north – on the far side of Ettringen – the Segbach, a small tributary of the Krufter Bach (Thürer Bach). The hill's south-southeastern neighbour is the Mayener Bellerberg (363.2 m).

=== Natural regions ===
From a natural region perspective, the Ettringer Bellerberg is located within the major unit group of the Middle Rhine Region (no. 29), in the major unit of the Lower Middle Rhine Region (292), the sub-unit of the Laach Volcanoes (292.0) and the natural region of the Ettringen Volcanic Kuppen (292.01). To the east the terrain transitions to the Pellenz Basin (291.221) in the natural region of the Pellenz Basin and Hill Country (291.22). To the south it descends to the Mayen Bowl (291.25), which is within the major unit of the Middle Rhine Basin (291). To the west it is adjoined by the major unit group of the East Eifel (no. 27), major unit of the Eastern High Eifel (271), the sub-unit of the Hohe-Acht/Nitz-Nette Upland (271.2) and the natural region of the Nitz-Nette Forest (271.21).

== Height ==
The Ettringer Bellerberg is 427.5 m hoch. On topographical maps, a spot height is printed near the summit with a height of 426.8 m. However, its height is usually given as about 428 m or 427 m.

== Protected areas ==
On the Ettringer Bellerberg is the nature reserve of Ettringen and Mayen Bellberg, Kottenheimer Büden' (CDDA no. 81634; designated in 1978; 63.87 ha in area) and parts of the bird reserve of the Lower Middle Rhine Region (Unteres Mittelrheingebiet, VSG no. 5609-401; 20.66 km^{2}).

== Leisure ==
Over the Ettringer Bellerberg runs a so-called "dream trail", the Volcano Path (Vulkanpfad), which is just under 7 km long and crosses the Kottenheimer Büden and runs through the nearby Kottenheimer Winfeld. From its summit the eastern flank of the Bellerberg Volcano, the Kottenheimer Büden, the Pellenz and the valleys of the Rhine and Moselle may be seen.

== Literature ==
- Angelika Hunold: Das Erbe des Vulkans. Eine Reise in die Erd- und Technikgeschichte zwischen Eifel und Rhein. Schnell + Steiner und Verlag des Römisch-Germanischen Zentralmuseums, Regensburg/Mainz, 2011, ISBN 978-3-7954-2439-8.
