= Volcano Park, Mayen-Koblenz =

Park in Vulkan Eifel, Germany

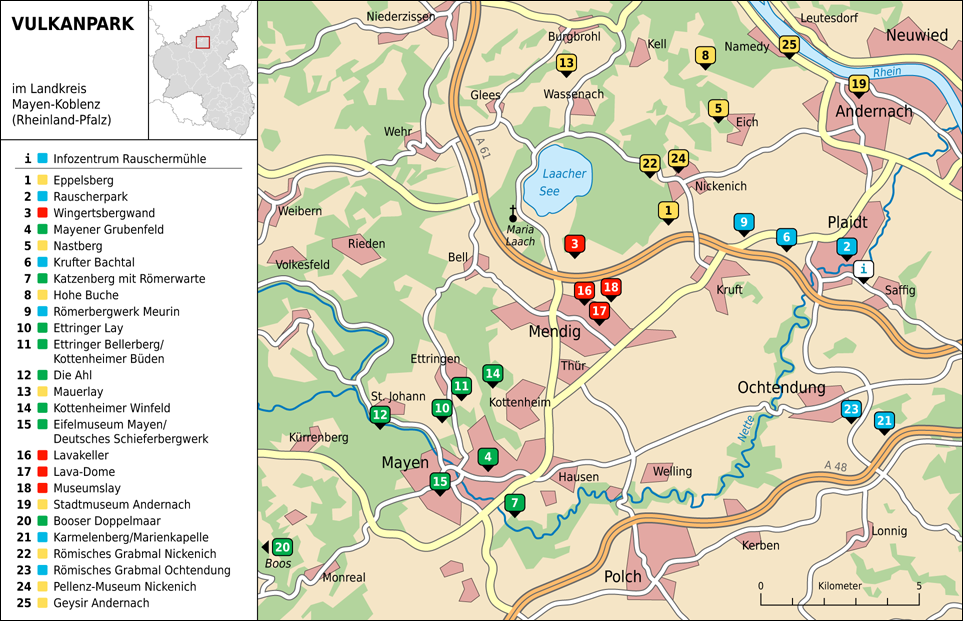
Map of the Volcano Park in Mayen-Koblenz

The Volcano Park in Mayen-Koblenz (German: Vulkanpark) is a geopark in the rural district of Mayen-Koblenz in the eastern Vulkan Eifel, Germany. It was founded in 1996 and wraps around the Laacher See (between Brohl-Lützing, Andernach, Plaidt, Mendig and Mayen). Together with the Volcano Park, Brohltal/Laacher See and the Vulkan Eifel Nature and Geo-Park, it forms part of the national Eifel Volcano Land Geo-Park (Geopark Vulkanland Eifel). The three parks are connected by the 280-kilometre-long German Volcano Route.

The Volcano Park illustrates volcanism in the Eifel, how the present-day landscape developed, and the exploitation of basalt, pumice and tuff since Roman times. It incorporates exhibits on volcanology, archaeology and industrial history, with educational trails and information signs. The museum incorporates a total of 25 stations, which can be combined in a single visit using four roads plus hiking and bicycle paths.

On 10 July 2010, the Volcano Park was honoured with the "European Union Cultural Heritage Prize" of the heritage protection organisation Europa Nostra, in the category of "Education, Instruction, Training and Consciousness Building". In 2003, the park's project at the Meurin Roman mine had won the same prize.

In 2010 the park had a record 220,000 visitors.

== Stations in the Volcano Park ==
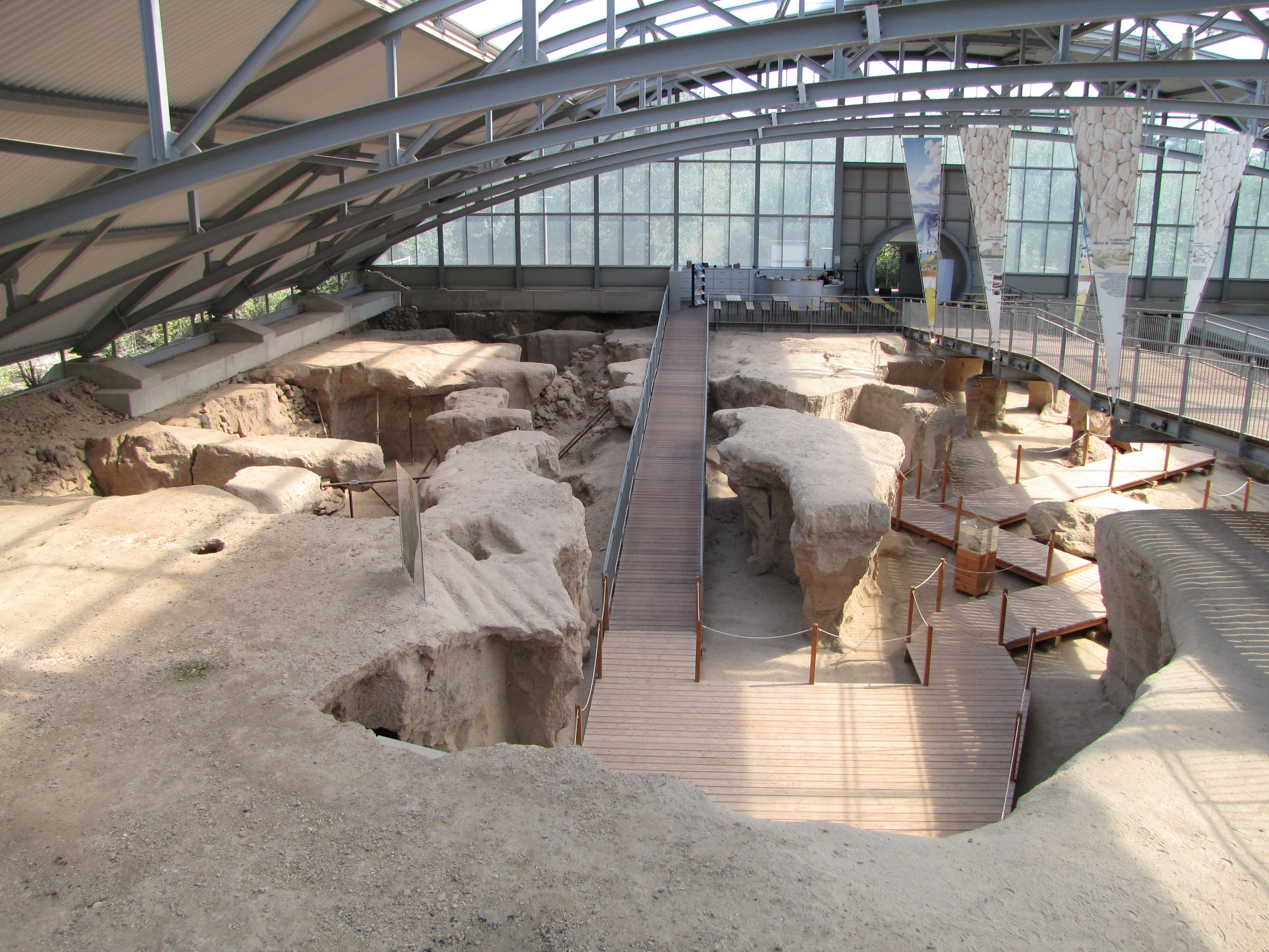
Meurin Roman mine at Kretz

=== Blue Route - Plaidt ===
- Rauschermühle information centre

Central departure point in Plaidt: information centre and museum with exhibits on the development of the Eifel mountains and the history of quarrying and mining

- Meurin Roman mine, at Kretz
- Kruft valley

Tuff deposits from the Laacher See volcanic eruption

- Karmelenberg (a cinder cone) and St. Mary's Chapel
- Roman grave monument in Ochtendung

Built of tuff from the Meurin mine

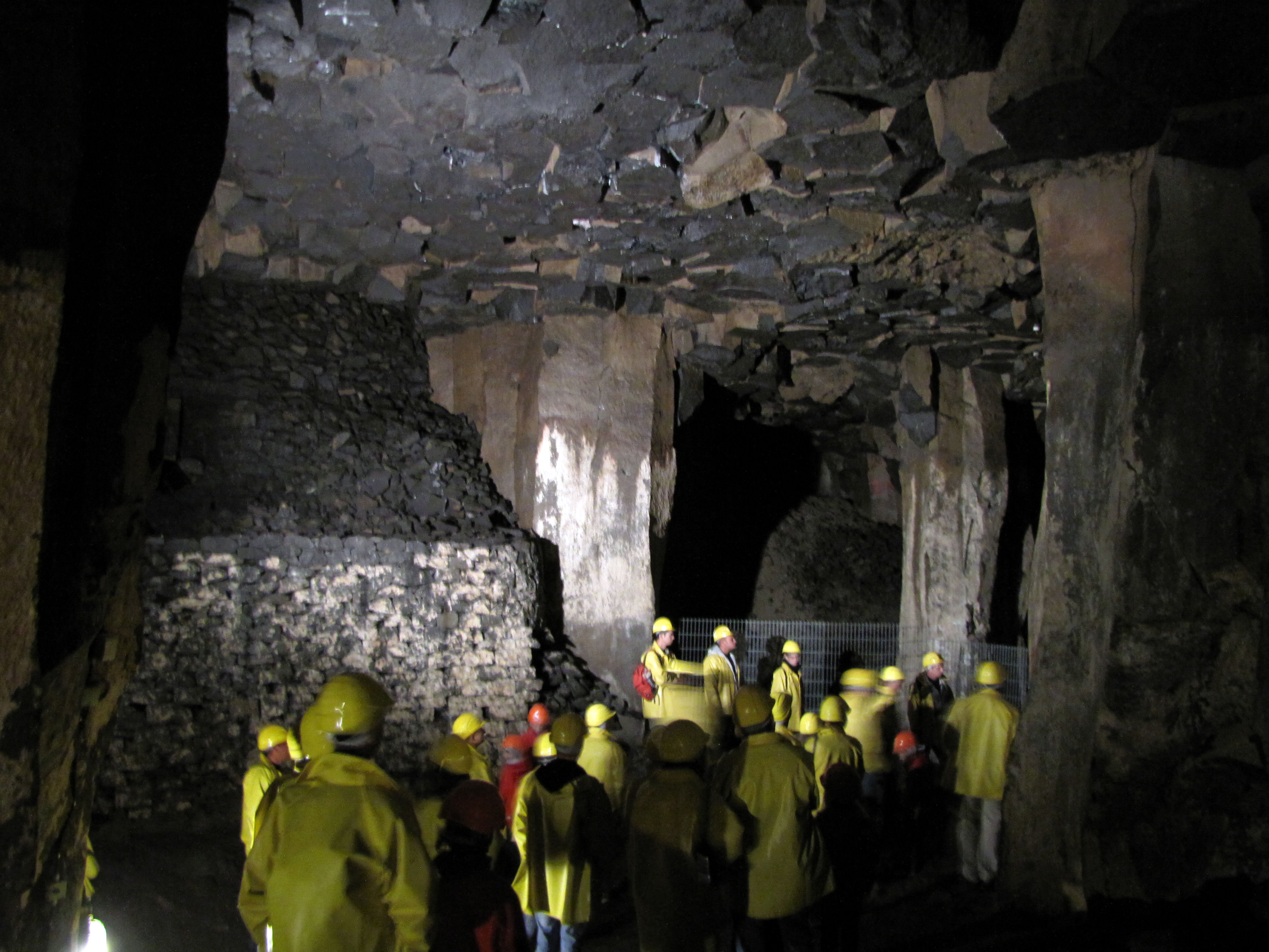
Mendig lava cellars

=== Red Route - Mendig ===
- Mendig lava dome

Museum with information on the history of volcanism and the geological history of the region

- Mendig lava cellars

3 square kilometres of chambers hewn out of the volcanic rock 32 metres under the town of Mendig

- Museum lay (cliff-face)

Open-air exhibit on the life of mine workers extracting and processing basaltic lava

- Wingert cliff-face

Cliff-face 50 metres high which records volcanological information about the eruption of the Laacher See volcano

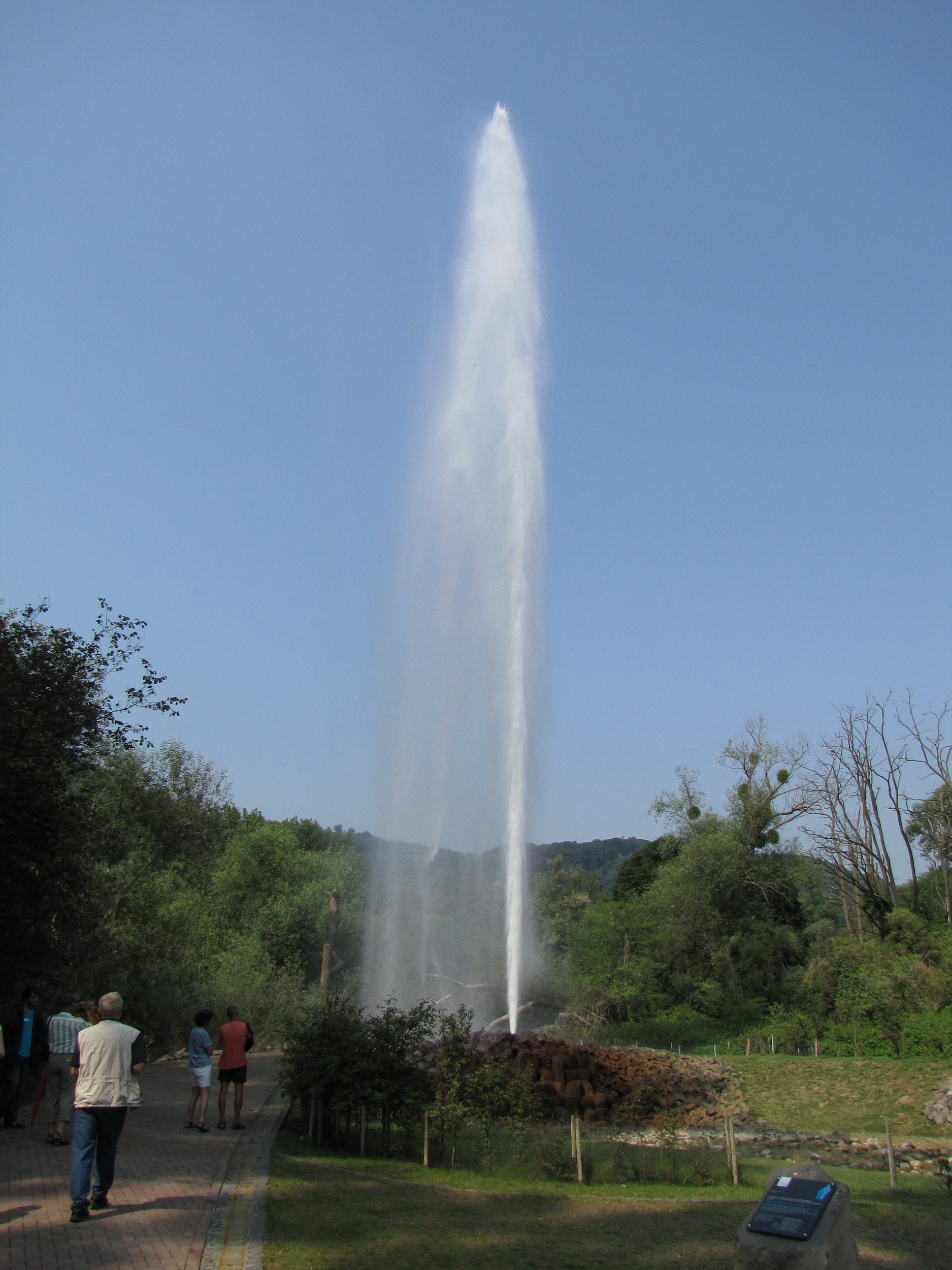
Andernach geyser

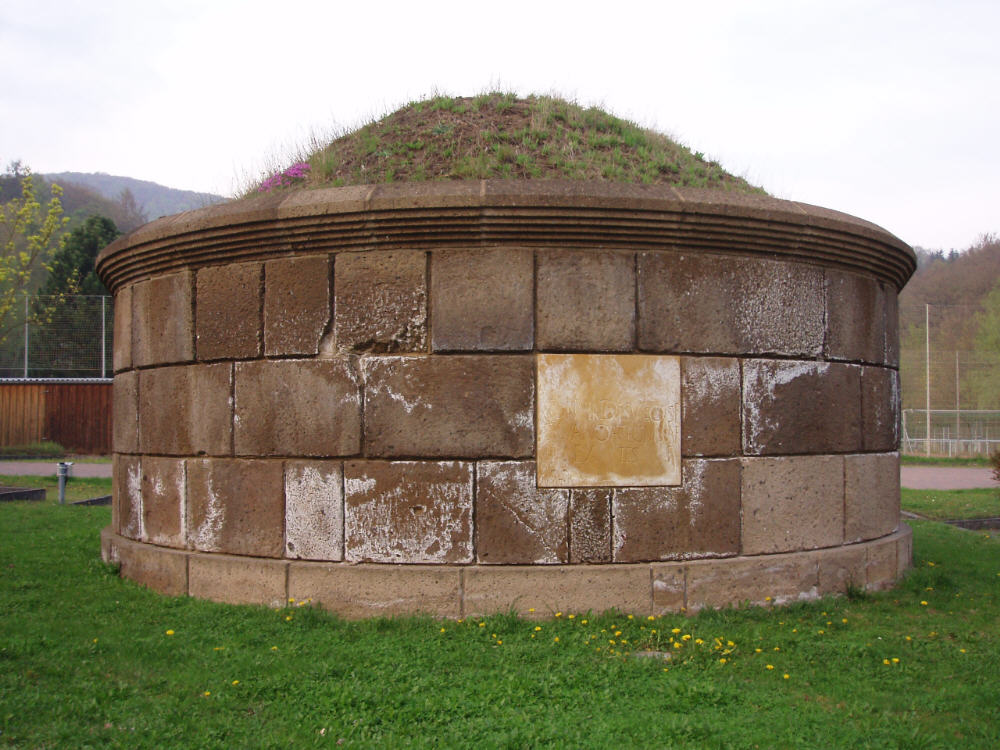
Roman mound-grave in Nickenich

=== Yellow Route - Andernach ===
- Andernach geyser

Tallest cold-water geyser in the world

- Andernach Town museum

Exhibit of historical products made of basaltic lava and tuff

- Nastberg

Former volcano at the Eich district of Andernach.

- Roman mound-grave in Nickenich

Built of tuff from the Meurin mine

- Pellenz archaeological museum in Nickenich

Contains finds from the prehistoric and historic, including Roman, periods

- Eppelsberg

Erosion has created a unique view of the interior of a 230,000-year-old volcano

- Mauerley near the Veitskopf

Roman quarry in the lava flow from the Veitskopf volcano

- Hohe Buche

Volcano whose basalt was used for construction in the Roman period and the early Middle Ages, for example in the Roman bridge at Trier

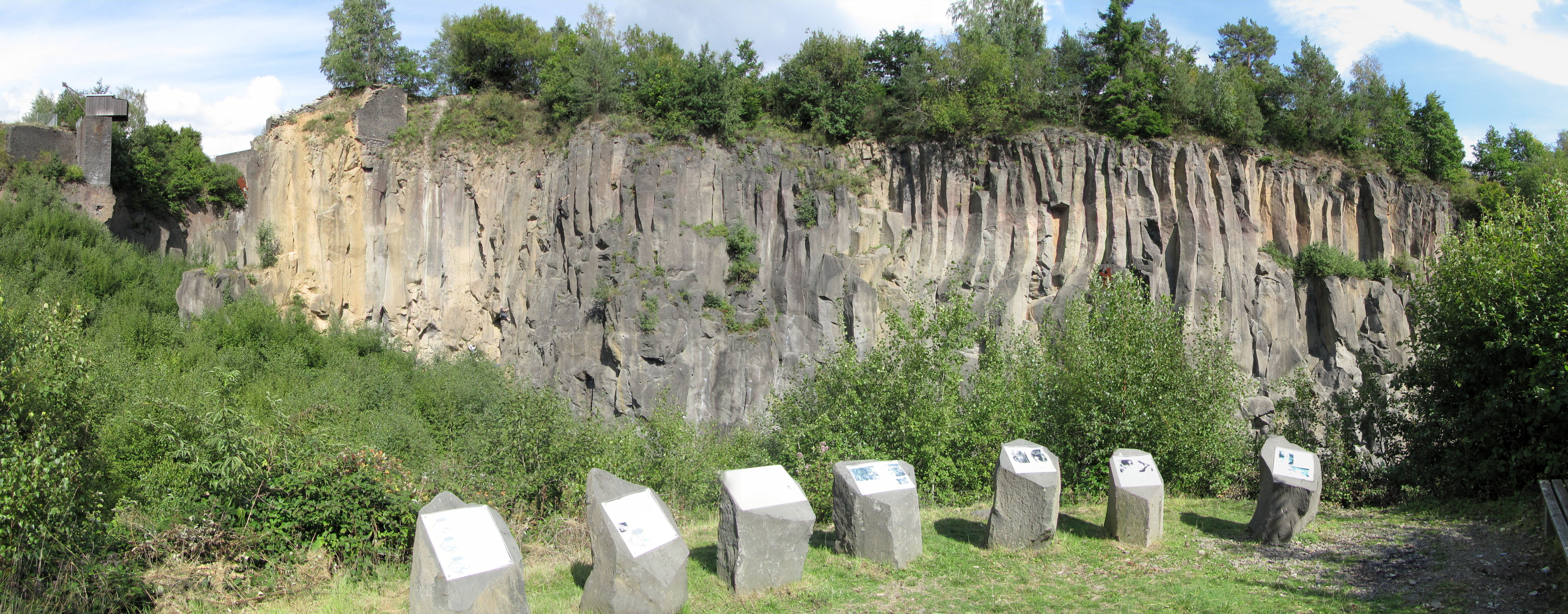
Basalt lay (cliff-face) at Ettringen

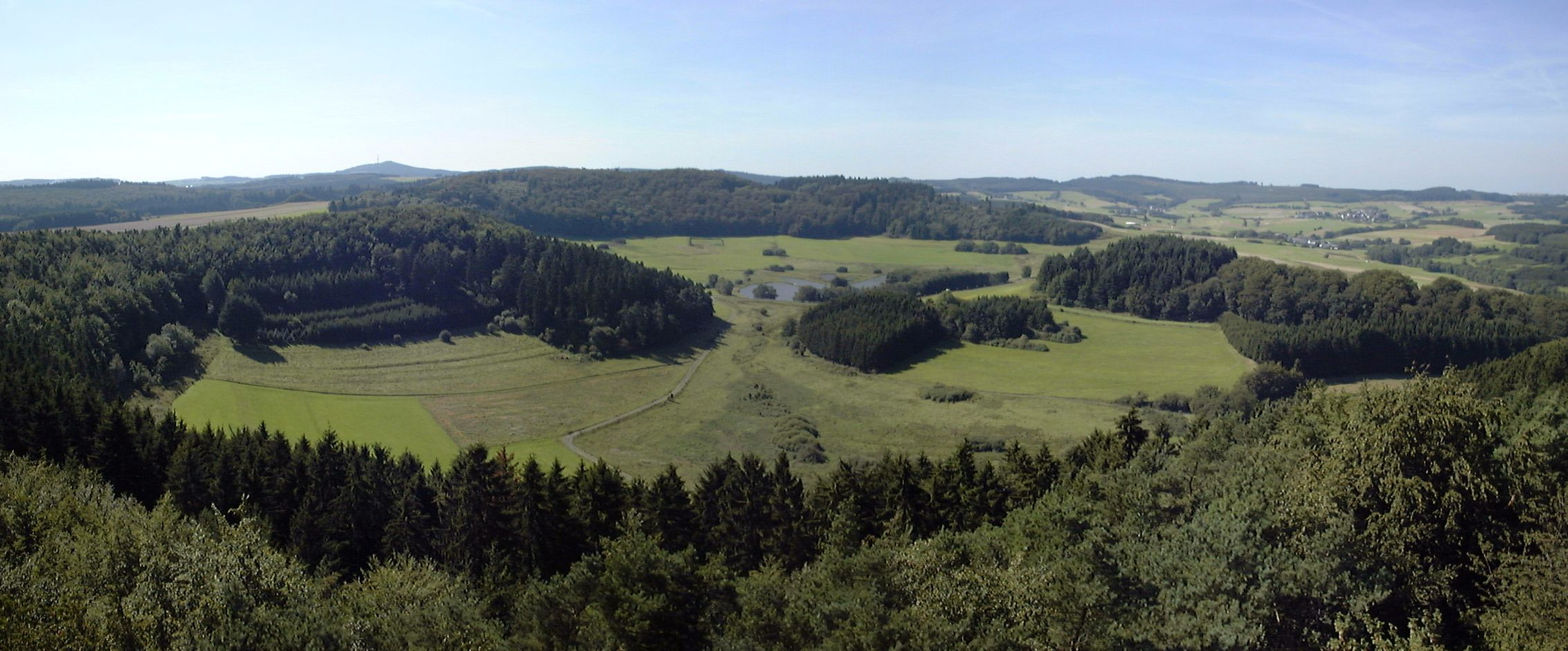
Double maar at Boos

=== Green Route - Mayen ===
- Kottenheim Winfeld

Quarry where Mayen Basalt Lava is extracted from the major lava field of the Bellerberg Volcano

- The Ahl at St. Johann

Bizarre rock formations created by the eruption of the Hochsimmer volcano

- Lay (cliff-face) at Ettringen

Former site of basalt and tuff mining operations with remains of cranes, crane platforms, railway lines and buildings

- Ettringen Bellerberg / Kottenheim Büden

West and east flanks of the large Bellerberg Volcano

- Mayen Eifel Museum in Genoveva Castle, with German slate mine
- Mayen quarry

Oldest and most important source of Mayen Basalt Lava

- Katzenberg

Site of the largest late Roman hill fort in the Eifel and Hunsrück

- Boos double maar

Twin maars at Boos

== Sources ==
- Karl-Heinz Schumacher and Wilhelm Meyer. Ed. Karl Peter Wiemer. Geopark Vulkanland Eifel. Lava-Dome und Lavakeller in Mendig. Rheinische Landschaften 57. Cologne: Rheinischer Verein für Denkmalpflege und Landschaftsschutz, 2006. ISBN 978-3-86526-006-2
- Werner P. d'Hein. Nationaler Geopark Vulkanland Eifel. Ein Natur- und Kulturführer. Düsseldorf: Gaasterland, 2006. ISBN 978-3-935873-15-4
