= Bellerberg Volcano =

Coordinates: 50.347334°N 7.230359°E

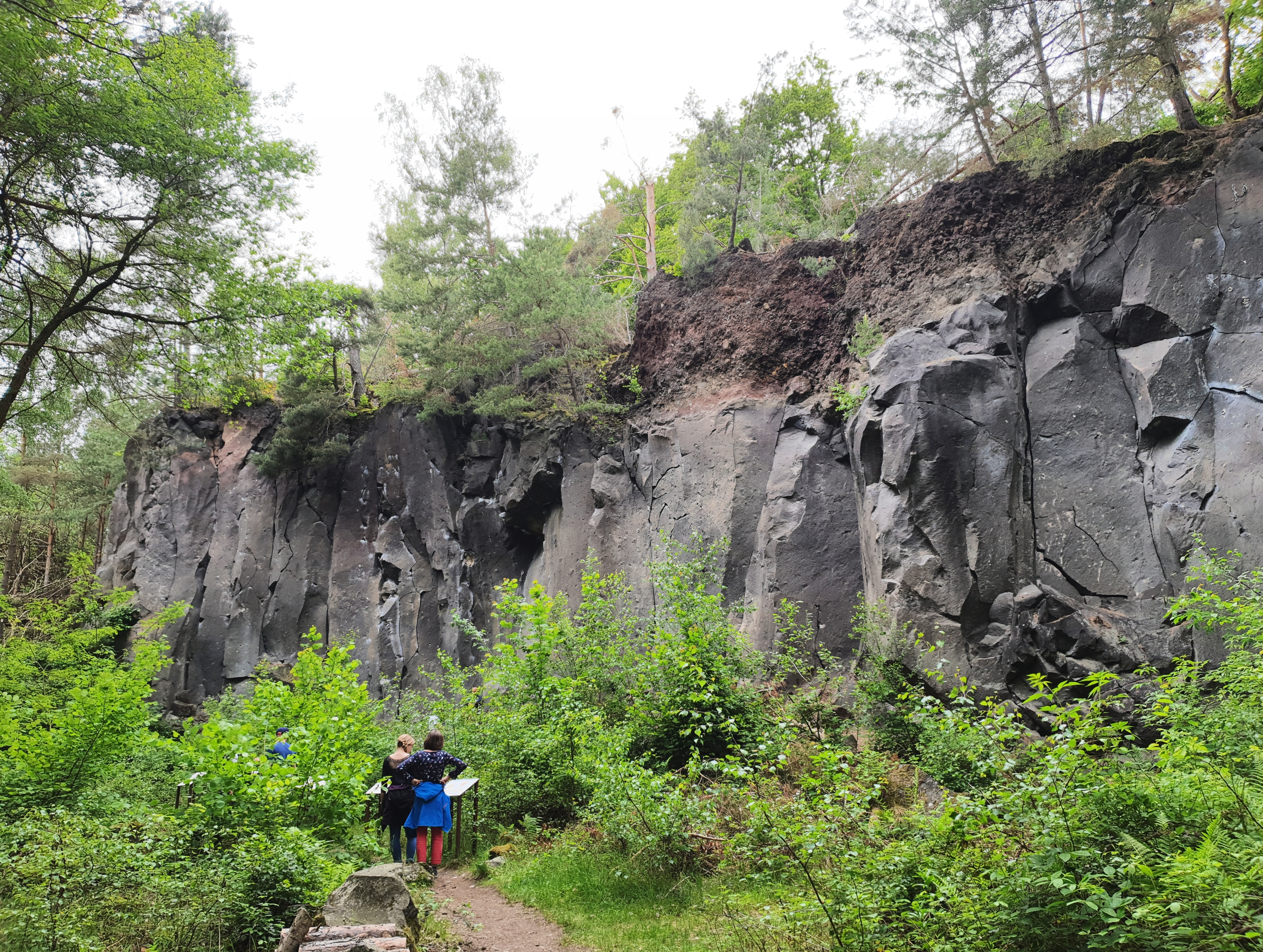

The Bellerberg Volcano (German: Bellerberg-Vulkan) is a volcano group that was formed 200,000 years ago by a large number of individual eruptions.

== Formation ==
The volcano complex lies in the East Eifel between the villages of Ettringen and Kottenheim and the town of Mayen on the edge of a fault zone of the Middle Rhine Basin. Violent movements caused disturbances in the bedrock, so that, along this fault, magma rose from a chamber at a depth of 10–20 km. Volcanic activity began approximately 200,000 years ago in the eastern part of the Bellerberg Volcano. Gaseous, 1,100 °C hot magma reached the Earth's surface at several eruption centres and formed smaller cinder cones. Huge quantities of lava fragments, which were thrown mainly in an easterly direction, formed the cinder ridge of the Kottenheimer Büden. Gradually, a crescent-shaped crater wall formed, which probably grew to more than 20 m high within a few days. In addition, longer fissures appeared, which produced large quantities of lava and thus gave rise to the Ettringer Bellerberg.

At a later date, gas pressure from the magma chamber decreased and the explosive fountains dried up. Instead, three lava streams flowed out of the Bellerberg Volcano which, thousands of years later were to become the basis of the economy in the surrounding villages in the form of basalt lava deposits: the Ettringer lava stream, the Mayen lava stream and the Winfeld lava stream. The Ettringen lava stream was the shortest, but most powerful of the three, and later formed the quarry area of the Ettringer Lay. The longest was the Mayen lava stream. Lava flowed more than 3 kilometres south into the valley of the Nette and was the basis for the quarries of the Mayener Grubenfeld. The northern stream, the Winfeld lava stream, became the quarry area of Kottenheimer Winfeld.

- Angelika Hunold: Das Erbe des Vulkans. Eine Reise in die Erd- und Technikgeschichte zwischen Eifel und Rhein. Schnell + Steiner und Verlag des Römisch-Germanischen Zentralmuseums, Regensburg/Mainz 2011, ISBN 978-3-7954-2439-8
