= Middle Rhine Basin =

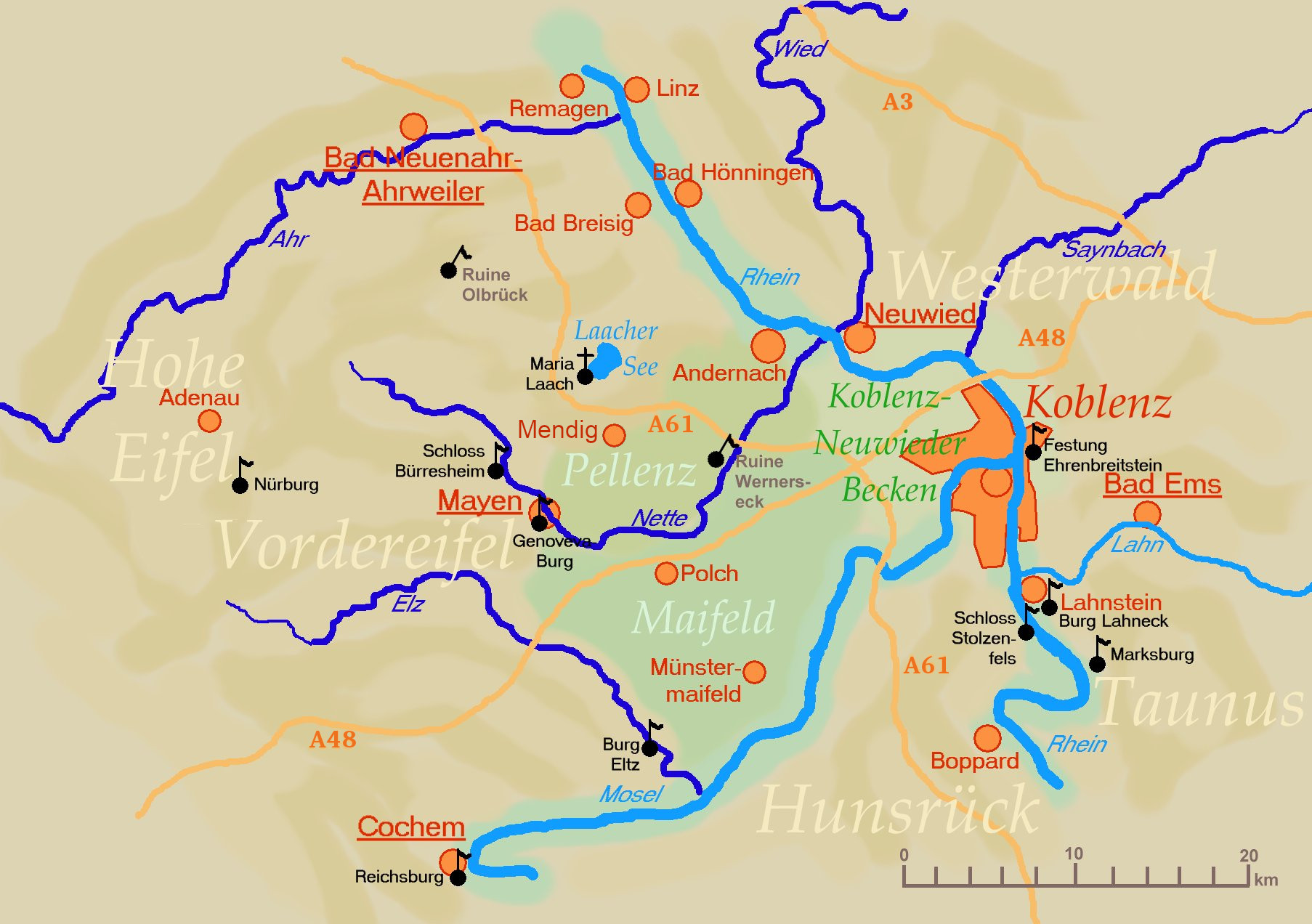
Map

The Middle Rhine Basin (German: Mittelrheinische Becken) is the central landscape region of the Middle Rhine in Germany and, along with the Limburg Basin, forms one of the biggest intra-montane lowland regions within the Rhenish Massif. The basin is divided into the valley bottom of the Neuwied Basin, the Neuwied Basin Perimeter east of the Rhine and the Lower Moselle Valley west of the Rhine in the south, and the Maifeld-Pellenz Hills in the north.

The basin is bounded on the east of the Rhine in the northeast and east by the slopes of the Westerwald and, on the west of the Rhine, from north to southwest by the Eifel mountains, and in the southeast by the valley of the Moselle above Moselkern. Its mild winters and dry climate enable intensive agriculture, which is why the landscape has few woods.

== Natural regions ==
The Handbook of Natural Region Divisions of Germany groups the Middle Rhine Basin within major unit group 29, the Middle Rhine Region, but classifies it as a major unit in its own right (no. 291) and subdivides it into the following sub-units:

- 291.0 Neuwied Rhine Valley Bottom (Rhine Valley)
- 291.1 Neuwied Basin Perimeter (east of the Rhine)
  - 291.10 Hüllenberg Terrace
  - 291.11 Wollendorf-Gladbach Basin Slopes
  - 291.12 Ehrenbreitstein Terrace
- 291.2 Maifeld-Pellenz Hills (west of the Rhine)
  - 291.20 Andernach-Koblenz Terrace Hills in wider sense (west of the Rhine)
    - 291.200 Andernach-Koblenz Terrace Hills in narrower sense (west of the Rhine and Moselle)
    - 291.201 Koblenz Moselle Valley
    - 291.202 Karthause (right of the Moselle and west of the Rhine)
  - 291.21 Karmelenberg Heights (clearly west of the Rhine)
  - 291.22 Pellenz Lowlands and Uplands (clearly west of the Rhine)
    - 291.220 Pellenz Volcanoes
    - 291.221 Pellenz Basin
    - 291.222 Pellenz Heights
  - 291.23 Lower Maifeld (west of the Rhine)
    - 291.230 Lower Maifeld Basin
    - 291.231 Lower Maifeld Terrace
    - 291.232 Lower Maifeld Heights
  - 291.24 Upper Maifeld (west)
  - 291.25 Mayen Bowl (west)
- 291.3 Lower Moselle Valley (west of the Rhine)
  - 291.30 Dieblicherberg Terrace (right of the Moselle)
  - 291.31 Lower Moselle Valley Basin (Moselle from Moselkern to Lay)

=== Neuwied Basin ===
This lowland area, also called the Koblenz-Neuwied Basin, which lies between the towns of Koblenz and Neuwied runs for a distance of c. 22 river kilometres along the Rhine and separates the narrow valley of Upper Rhine from that of the Middle Rhine. Due to its fertile soils, the Neuwied Basin has been settled from the earliest times. The countryside is today characterised as much by intensive fruit growing as industrial sites. The urban area of the Neuwied Basin has a population of about 300,000.

==== Cities and towns ====
- Andernach
- Bendorf
- Koblenz
- Mülheim-Kärlich
- Neuwied
- Vallendar
- Weißenthurm

=== Maifeld ===
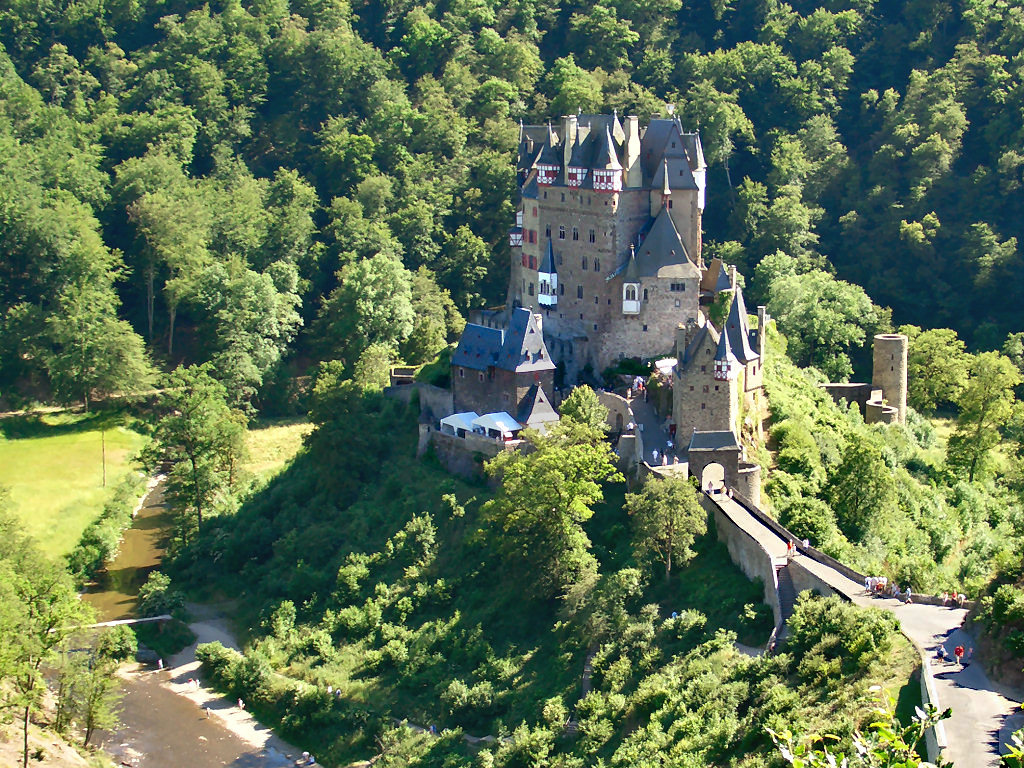
The Elzbach and Eltz Castle

This southwestern part of the Middle Rhine Basin is particularly striking due to its gently rolling hills. It is bounded by the river valleys of the Moselle (southeast) and Elz (southwest), which cut deeply into the hill country; its northwest border is partly formed by the Nette. This regions is mainly utilised for agriculture. The soils are considered particularly fertile. Towns in the Maifeld are Polch (seat of the Verbandsgemeinde of Maifeld in the county of Mayen-Koblenz, but strictly speaking in the Pellenz) and Münstermaifeld.

=== Pellenz ===
This hill country forms the northwestern part of the basin between Mayen and Andernach. It is characterized by agriculture and open-cast mining (pumice and lava sand) and the associated building materials industry. The river Nette flows through the hilly landscape which slopes gently from west to east towards the Rhine and separates it from the Maifeld.

== General sources ==
- Bundesamt für Naturschutz
  - Kartendienste
  - Landschaftssteckbriefe
    - Neuwieder Rheintalweitung
    - Neuwieder Beckenrand und Maifeld-Pellenzer Hügelland
    - Unteres Moseltal

== Literature ==
- Frauke Gränitz et al. (eds.), Das Mittelrheinische Becken. Eine landeskundliche Bestandsaufnahme im Raum Andernach, Bendorf, Koblenz, Mayen, Mendig, Münstermaifeld und Neuwied (Vol. 65 of the series "Landschaften in Deutschland"), Cologne/Weimar/Vienna: Böhlau, 2003, ISBN 3412101028 (grundlegende geographische Bestandsaufnahme)
