= Ochtendung =

- Municipality
- Coat of arms

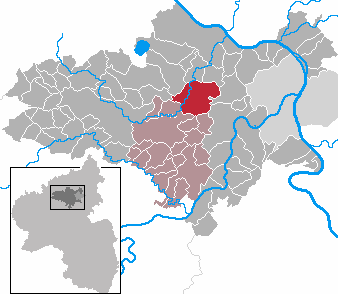
- Location of Ochtendung within Mayen-Koblenz district
- Interactive map of Ochtendung
- Location within Germany Location within Rhineland-Palatinate
- Coordinates: 50°20′53″N 7°23′23″E
- Country: Germany
- State: Rhineland-Palatinate
- District: Mayen-Koblenz
- Municipal assoc.: Maifeld

Government
  - Mayor (2019–24): Lothar Kalter (SPD)

Area
  - Total: 24.05 km^{2} (9.29 sq mi)
- Elevation: 200 m (660 ft)

Population (2025-12-31)
  - Total: 5,352
  - Density: 222.5/km^{2} (576.4/sq mi)
- Time zone: UTC+01:00 (CET)
  - Summer (DST): UTC+02:00 (CEST)
- Postal codes: 56299
- Dialling codes: 02625
- Vehicle registration: MYK
- Website: www.ochtendung.de

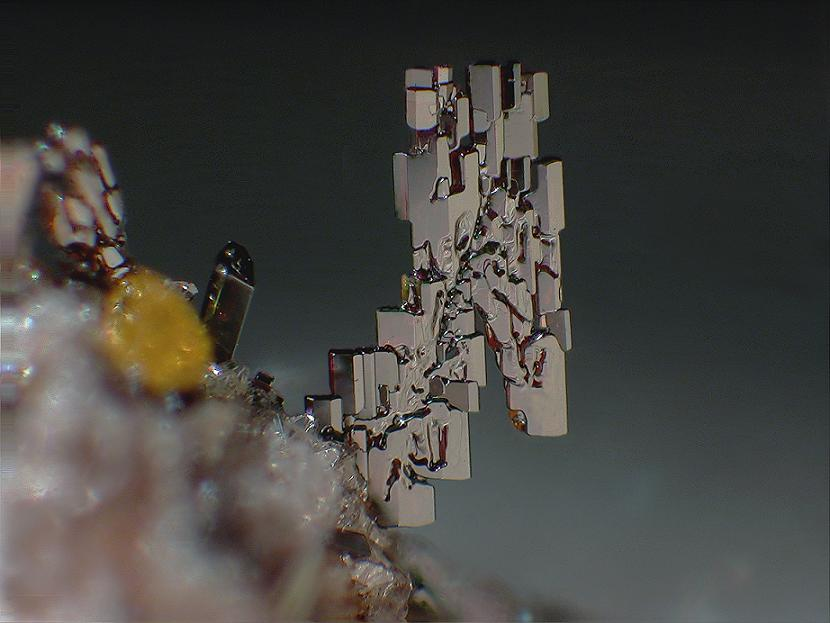
Microphotograph of pseudobrookite (Mindat) mineral specimen, Wannenköpfe, Ochtendung. Image width 2.5 mm.

Ochtendung (German pronunciation: [ˈɔxtn̩dʊŋ]) is a municipality in the district of Mayen-Koblenz in Rhineland-Palatinate, western Germany.

== Geography ==
Ochtendung lies between the A 48 and A 61 motorways and has designated junctions from both. The village lies on the Nette and is neighboured by the municipalities of Lonnig, Bassenheim, Plaidt, Kruft and Saffig. Up until a few years ago, the B 258 road started in Koblenz before running through Ochtendung and Mayen towards Belgium, passing the Nürburgring. The stretch between Koblenz and Mayen was regraded due to the proximity to the A 48 and has since been the L 98.

== Municipal Division ==
The districts Alsingerhof, Emmingerhof, Fressenhöfe Waldorferhof and Sackenheimerhöfe (previously a Bassenheim district) make up the municipality of Ochtendung.

== Etymology ==
The name of the village is derived from the word Thing or Ding (Ochtendung). A 'Thing' was a governing assembly in Germanic societies.

== Politics ==
The Gemeinderat (comparable to the town council in English) of Ochtendung consists of 22 council members, voted in after the local elections of 7 July 2009 and headed by the Ortsbürgermeister in a voluntary position, as per the custom in the state of Rhineland Palatinate for village municipalities. This position is similar to the position of a town mayor.

The allocation of seats after the election is as follows:

SPD 11 seats
CDU 7 seats
FWG1 2 seats
WG Ich tu's (I do it) 2 seats

== Sights and Tourism ==
- Wernerseck Castle
- Karmelenberg, a volcanic cinder cone
- Kulturhalle Ochtendung, used for holding special events
- Remains of the town wall
- Cycle and Sculpture Trail between Ochtendung and Polch

== Famous residents ==
Jakob Vogt (1902–1985) Weightlifter
Jürgen Weigt (born 1957) Brigadier in the German Army
Peter Peters (born 1962) Journalist and football Functionary
Kristin Silbereisen (born 1985) Table Tennis Player

== Sources ==
Human Evolution, 19,1 S. 1 - 8 (2004)
Terra Nostra, Schriften der GeoUnion Alfred-Wegener-Stiftung, 2006/2 (Kongresszeitschrift)
Dr. Axel von Berg's discovery (German Only)
Local Election Results 2009 (German Only)
