= Meurin =

Meurin may refer to:

- Pierre Meurin (born 1989), French politician
- Meurin Roman mine
