= Bundesautobahn 48 =

Federal motorway in Germany

A 48
- Bundesautobahn 48
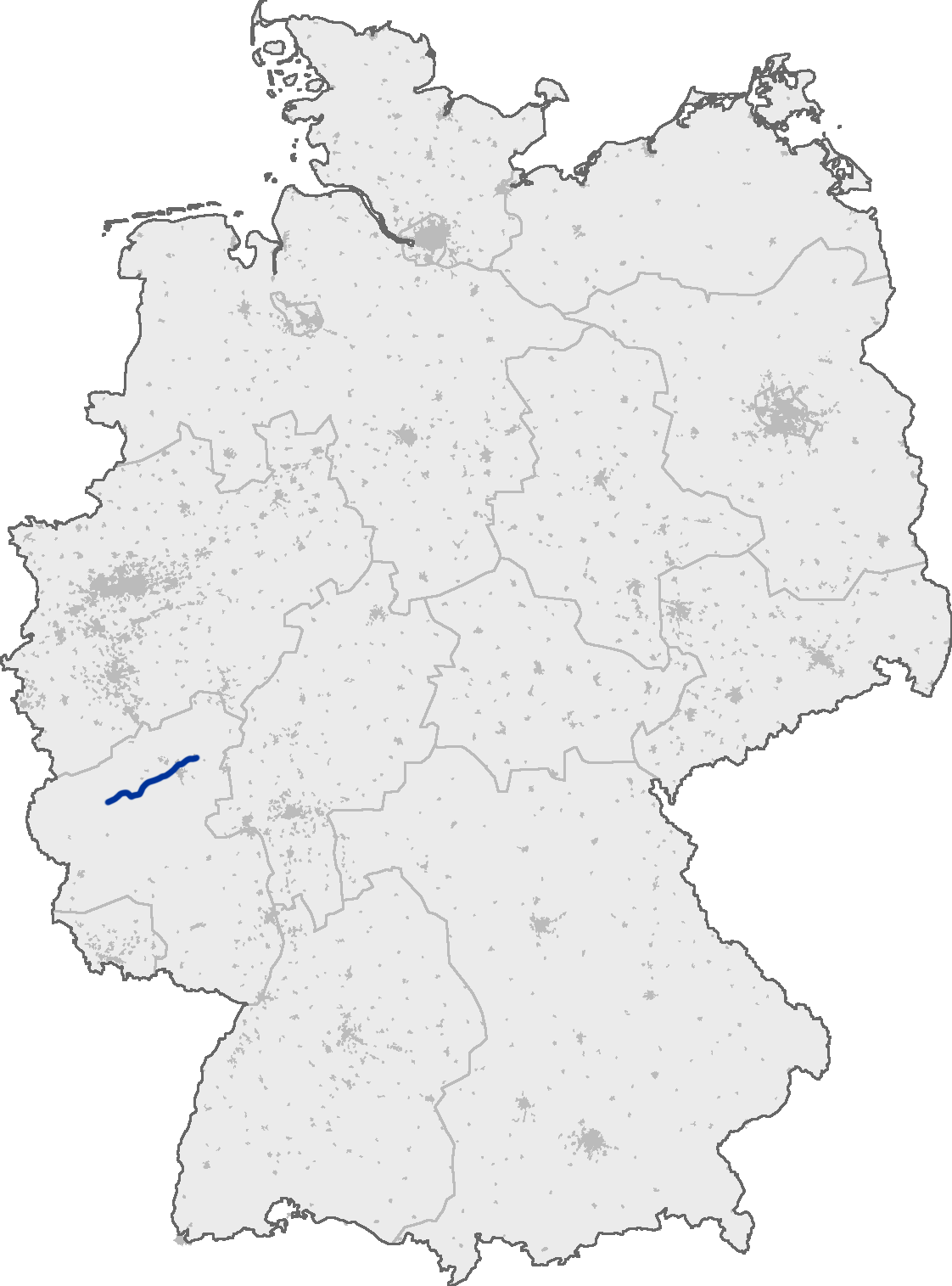

Route information
- Length: 79 km (49 mi)

Major junctions
- West end: A 1 in Steiningen
- East end: A 3 in Dernbach

Location
- Country: Germany
- States: Rhineland-Palatinate

Highway system
- Roads in Germany; Autobahns; List; Federal; List; State; E-roads
← A 46	→ A 49

Bundesautobahn 48 (translates from German as Federal Motorway 48, short form Autobahn 48, abbreviated as BAB 48 or A 48) is an autobahn in western Germany. From the junction with the A 1 it connects to the A 3 and A 61 near Koblenz and is fully part of European route E 44.

== Exit list ==
(1)	Vulkaneifel 3-way interchange A 1 E44
	Steininger Höhe/Bierscheid parking area
(2)	Ulmen B 259
	Uersfeld parking area
	Höchstberg parking area
(3)	Laubach
	Martental/Good viewpoint parking area
(4)	Kaisersesch
	Belzweide/Herberkaul parking area
(5)	Kaifenheim
	Elz Viaduct 380 m
	Services Elztal
(6)	Mayen B 262
	Rotendall parking area
(7)	Polch
	Mammutgrube parking area
	Schnackenborn/Münsterer Höhe parking area
(8)	Ochtendung
	Goloring/Karmelenberg parking area
(9)	Koblenz 4-way interchange A 61 E31
	Schießer Weg/Erdkaul parking area
(10)	Koblenz-Nord B 9
	Bendorf Bridge 1029 m
(11)	Bendorf/Neuwied B 42
	Auf der Zeg parking area
	Nonnenberg parking area
	Services Grenzau
(12)	Höhr-Grenzhausen
	Brexbach Viaduct 260 m
	Seelbachwiese/Mühlholz parking area
	Kannebäckerland parking area
(13)	Dernbach 3-way interchange A 3 E35 E44
