= Karmelenberg =

Mountain in Germany

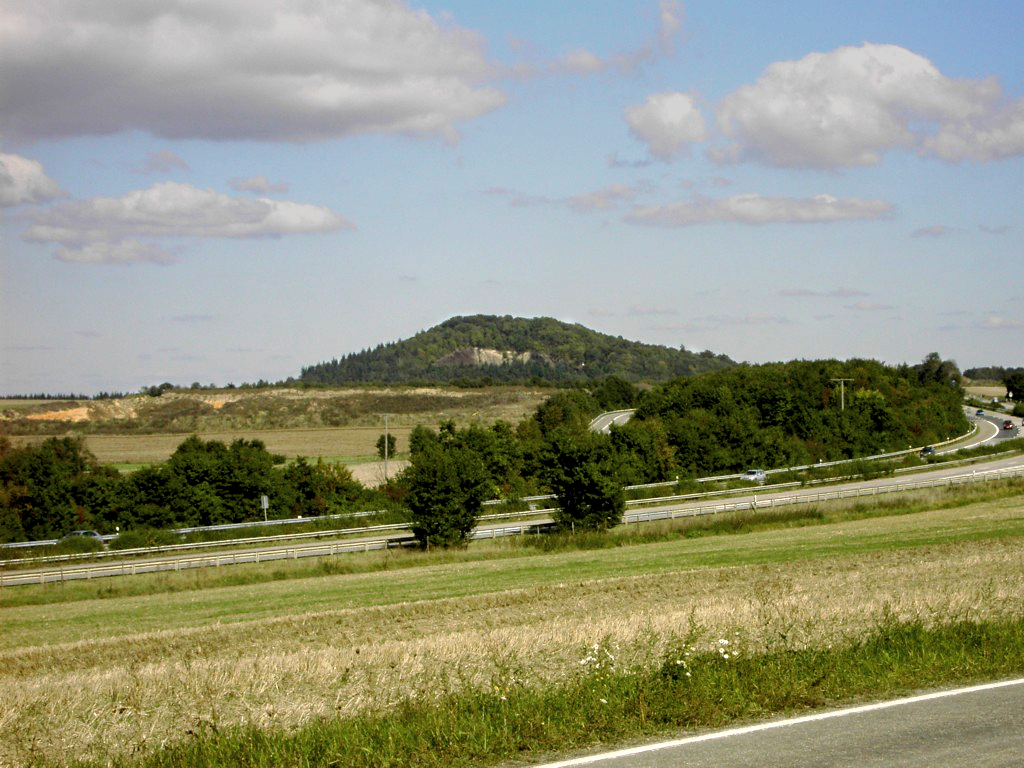
- The Karmelenberg. Foreground: the motorway from Koblenz to Trier

Highest point
- Elevation: 372 m above sea level (NHN) (1,220 ft)
- Coordinates: 50°20′39″N 7°25′24″E

Geography
- Location within Rhineland-Palatinate
- Location: Mayen-Koblenz, Rhineland-Palatinate, Germany
- Parent range: Maifeld-Pellenz Hill Country

Geology
- Mountain type: cinder cone

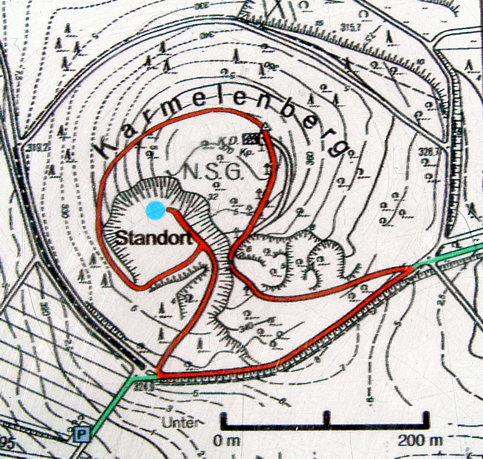
Map of the Karmelenberg showing local footpaths

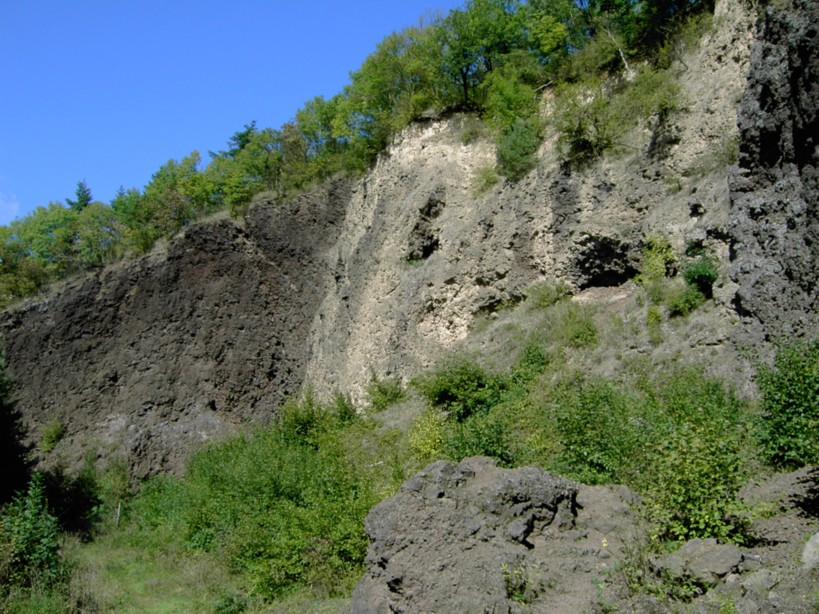
Geological outcrop at the old quarry

The Karmelenberg is a wooded cinder cone that was formed by volcanic activity. It marks the southeastern end of the East Eifel volcano field and rises to a height of 372 m above sea level (NHN), about 170 metres above the Pellenz region, and is visible from a long way off.

In the UNO Year of Mountains (2002), the Karmelenberg was Mountain/Hill of the Month in Germany. A monument records the proclamation on 21 June 2002.

As part of the Volcano Park (station 21), the hill is counted as a tourist attraction. Various information boards explain both its volcanic past as well as the history of St. Mary's Chapel at the summit.

The hill is named after Mount Carmel in the Carmel massif, an important Biblical site and modern landmark in northwestern Israel.

The entire cinder cone of the Karmelenberg has been designated as a nature reserve.

== Location ==
The Karmelenberg belongs to the municipality of Bassenheim and is situated close to the Ochtendung junction on the A 48 motorway. Nearby is the Goloring, an important area monument. The Karmelenberg may be climbed from Bassenheim up a 1.5-kilometre-long avenue (natural monument ND-7137-386), from Ochtendung or from the L 52 from Koblenz to Polch.

== Geology ==
The cinder cone of the Karmelenberg is part of a volcanic group with ten eruption centres that was active about 350,000 to 300,000 years ago. In addition to the Karrmelenberg main top, there are also the Schweinskopf and the so-called Oberholzgruppe, of which no trace is visible any longer. The Schweinskopf is almost completely levelled due to quarrying.

The Karmelenberg Group lies partly on the edge fault of the Neuwied Basin. On its north side, the Devonian bedrock of Hunsrück slates is about 100 metres down. On the south side lie riparian gravels of the Ur-Moselle. The three lava flows that emanated from the Karmelenberg are covered by pumice and loess.

== Quarrying ==
The large quarry, which is still visible, was established in the 20th century. The high, vertical faces of the outcrop were produced by a special, high risk, quarrying technique known as Hohlmachen (“cave making”). At the foot off the rock face a low cave was hewn out and filled with wood. After blowing up the wooden props, large areas of the rock face collapsed to the ground.

== Nature reserve ==
The Karmelenberg Nature Reserve (NSG-7137-031) has an area of 10.74 ha. It was designated on 7 May 1981 by the Bezirksregierung Koblenz.

Its aim is the preservation of the Karmelenberg for scientific and cultural reasons due to its geological character including its outcrops, it habitat for rare and endangered wild flowers and plants and its natural beauty and uniqueness.

== See also ==
- List of volcanoes in Germany
