= Saffig =

- Municipality
- Coat of arms

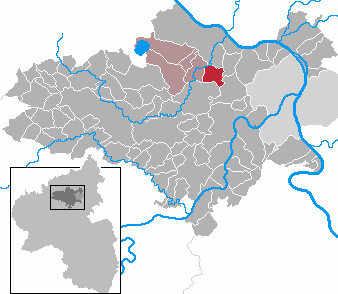
- Location of Saffig within Mayen-Koblenz district
- Interactive map of Saffig
- Location within Germany Location within Rhineland-Palatinate
- Coordinates: 50°22′48″N 7°24′57″E
- Country: Germany
- State: Rhineland-Palatinate
- District: Mayen-Koblenz
- Municipal assoc.: Pellenz

Government
  - Mayor (2019–24): Dirk Rohm

Area
  - Total: 6.97 km^{2} (2.69 sq mi)
- Elevation: 130 m (430 ft)

Population (2025-12-31)
  - Total: 2,228
  - Density: 320/km^{2} (828/sq mi)
- Time zone: UTC+01:00 (CET)
  - Summer (DST): UTC+02:00 (CEST)
- Postal codes: 56648
- Dialling codes: 02625
- Vehicle registration: MYK
- Website: www.saffig.de

Saffig (German pronunciation: [ˈzafɪç]) is a municipality in the district of Mayen-Koblenz in Rhineland-Palatinate, western Germany.

== The emblem ==
The organ pipes and the ear show St. Cäcilia, the patron saint of the Catholic church of Saffig. The lava dome shows the territory of volcanos, where Saffig is.

== History ==
The village was first referenced in 1258 as "Saffge". Saffig was a fiefdom of Cologne until 1481, when it became a fiefdom of the family von der Leyen. After the annexation of sinistral territory of the Rhine during the French Revolutionary Wars (1794–1815), Saffig was a "Mairie" of France. Saffig has been part of the Pellenz Verbandsgemeinde since 1992.

== Buildings and sights ==
- St. Cäcilia Catholic Church - Designed by Balthasar Neumann (1739–1742) and his pupil Johannes Seiz
- The Palace Garden - Formerly part of the Palace territory of the family von der Leyen
- Synagogue - Now a memorial
- "Von-der-Leyen Halle" - A multipurpose hall
