= Laach Castle (Kruft) =

- Burg Laach, Pfalzgrafenburg
- Kruft

Site information
- Type: hill castle, spur location, motte
- Code: DE-RP
- Condition: burgstall (no above-ground ruins)

Location
- Location within Rhineland-Palatinate Location within Germany
- Coordinates: 50°24′27″N 7°16′45″E
- Height: 318 m above sea level (NHN)

Site history
- Built: 11th C.

Garrison information
- Occupants: nobility

Laach Castle (German: Burg Laach), also called the Pfalzgrafen Castle (Pfalzgrafenburg or 'Count Palatine's Castle'), is a levelled Salian spur castle by the Laacher See (Lake Laach) opposite the Abbey of Maria Laach. The castle site lies on the territory of Kruft in the county of Mayen-Koblenz in the German state of Rhineland-Palatinate.

== Location ==
Laach was a motte and bailey castle which stood at a height 318 m above NHN on a rock spur which, at that time, was a peninsula because the level of the lake was 15 metres higher. It stood above the eastern shore of the lake and was temporarily the seat of the Rhenish counts Palatine. Count Palatine Henry of Laach from the House of Luxembourg-Gleiberg (died 1095) founded the monastery of Laach (Latin: monasterium ad lacum) in 1093. Laach Castle (Latin: castellum ad lacum) was demolished in 1112 by the stepson and adoptive son of Count Palatine Siegfried of Ballenstedt at the instigation of the abbey, who wanted to be absolutely safe from interference by the lord of the castle, the Count Palatine. The demolition of the castle was not a great loss for Siegfried, as he had another castle, Rheineck, nearby.

The 170 -metre-long castle was divided into two sections, the oval bailey facing the lake, the elongated one facing the hinterland. A mighty neck ditch terminated the eastern side 'land' side. Two cross ditches between the two castle baileys offered further protection. Stone towers are evidenced from their foundations (three square towers with 4.5 metre (2) or 8 metre-long sides). The remaining buildings were probably made of wood.

At the beginning of the 16th century only a few remains of the castle were still visible. Today, only few traces and the names of the fields "Laacher Burg" and "Alte Burg" indicate its existence.

== Remains of Roman buildings ==
During an excavation in 1935, Roman bricks were found by Mayen excavator, Josef Kramer, on the summit of the hill spur. Further remnants of brick were discovered in the 1980s near the lava quarry pit in Hangschutt. These finds suggest that there were originally Roman buildings in the area of the castle. Due to its strategic location and its proximity (approx. 200 metres) to a Roman farmstead in the great Roß valley, Gerd Otto interprets these finds as remains of a defensive structure or refuge fort from late Roman times. Siegfried of Ballenstedt's demolition of the castle also now appeared in a new light. Perhaps the remains of a pagan fort within sight of their monastery caused the monks a certain unease.

== Literature ==
- Horst Wolfgang Böhme (ed.): Burgen der Salierzeit. 2 volumes. Thorbecke, Sigmaringen, 1991, ISBN 3-7995-4134-9.
