= Pellenz (Verbandsgemeinde) =

Verbandsgemeinde in Rhineland-Palatinate, Germany

- Verbandsgemeinde
- Coat of arms

- Location of Pellenz within Mayen-Koblenz district
- Interactive map of Pellenz
- Location within Germany Location within Rhineland-Palatinate
- Coordinates: 50°23′N 7°23′E
- Country: Germany
- State: Rhineland-Palatinate
- District: Mayen-Koblenz
- Seat: Plaidt
- Subdivisions: 5 municipalities

Area
  - Total: 55.35 km^{2} (21.37 sq mi)

Population (2025-12-31)
  - Total: 17,512
  - Density: 316.4/km^{2} (819.4/sq mi)
- Time zone: UTC+01:00 (CET)
  - Summer (DST): UTC+02:00 (CEST)
- Website: www.pellenz.de

Coat of arms (old)

Pellenz is a Verbandsgemeinde ("collective municipality") in the district of Mayen-Koblenz, located in Rhineland-Palatinate, Germany. It is situated north-east of Mayen and south of Andernach. Originally, the seat of the municipality was in Andernach, which was not part of the municipality itself, but it has been in Plaidt since 2017, where a new office building was built.

The Verbandsgemeinde Pellenz consists of the following Ortsgemeinden ("local municipalities"):

1. Kretz
2. Kruft
3. Nickenich
4. Plaidt
5. Saffig
