= Nickenich =

- Municipality
- Coat of arms

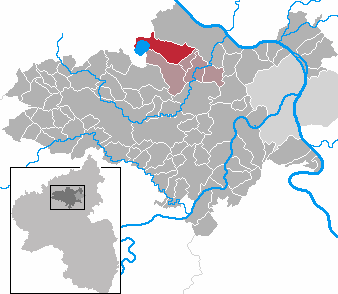
- Location of Nickenich within Mayen-Koblenz district
- Interactive map of Nickenich
- Location within Germany Location within Rhineland-Palatinate
- Coordinates: 50°24′48″N 7°19′47″E
- Country: Germany
- State: Rhineland-Palatinate
- District: Mayen-Koblenz
- Municipal assoc.: Pellenz

Government
  - Mayor (2019–24): Detlev Leersch (CDU)

Area
  - Total: 16.56 km^{2} (6.39 sq mi)
- Elevation: 210 m (690 ft)

Population (2025-12-31)
  - Total: 3,744
  - Density: 226.1/km^{2} (585.6/sq mi)
- Time zone: UTC+01:00 (CET)
  - Summer (DST): UTC+02:00 (CEST)
- Postal codes: 56645
- Dialling codes: 02632
- Vehicle registration: MYK
- Website: www.nickenich.de

Nickenich (German pronunciation: [ˈnɪkənɪç]) is a municipality in the district of Mayen-Koblenz in Rhineland-Palatinate, western Germany.

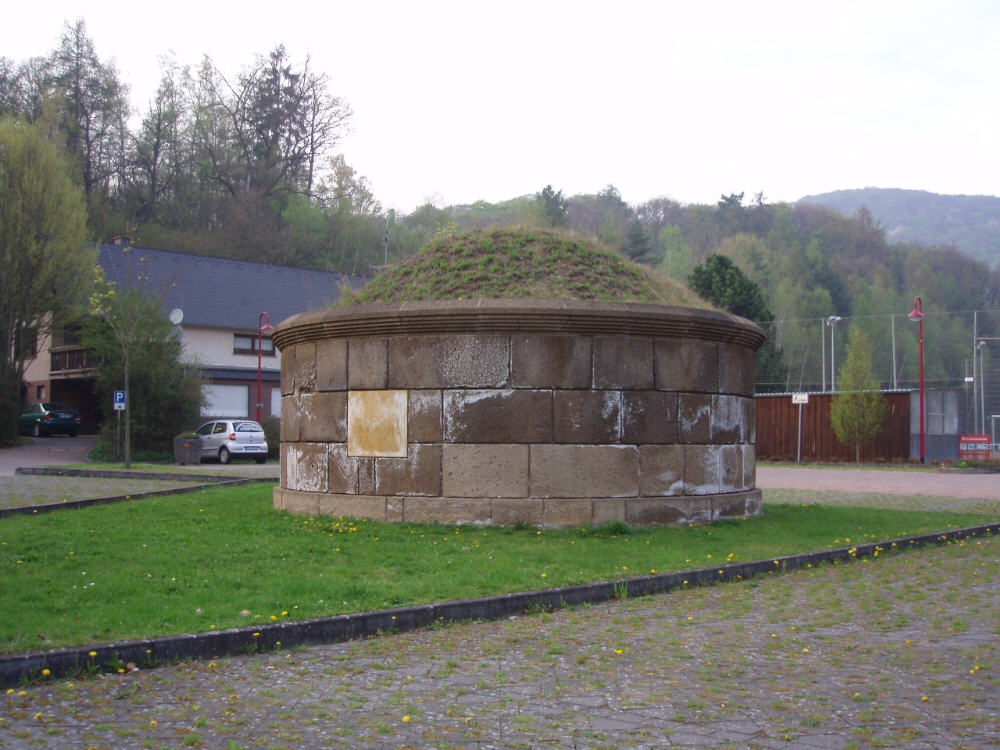
Tumulus

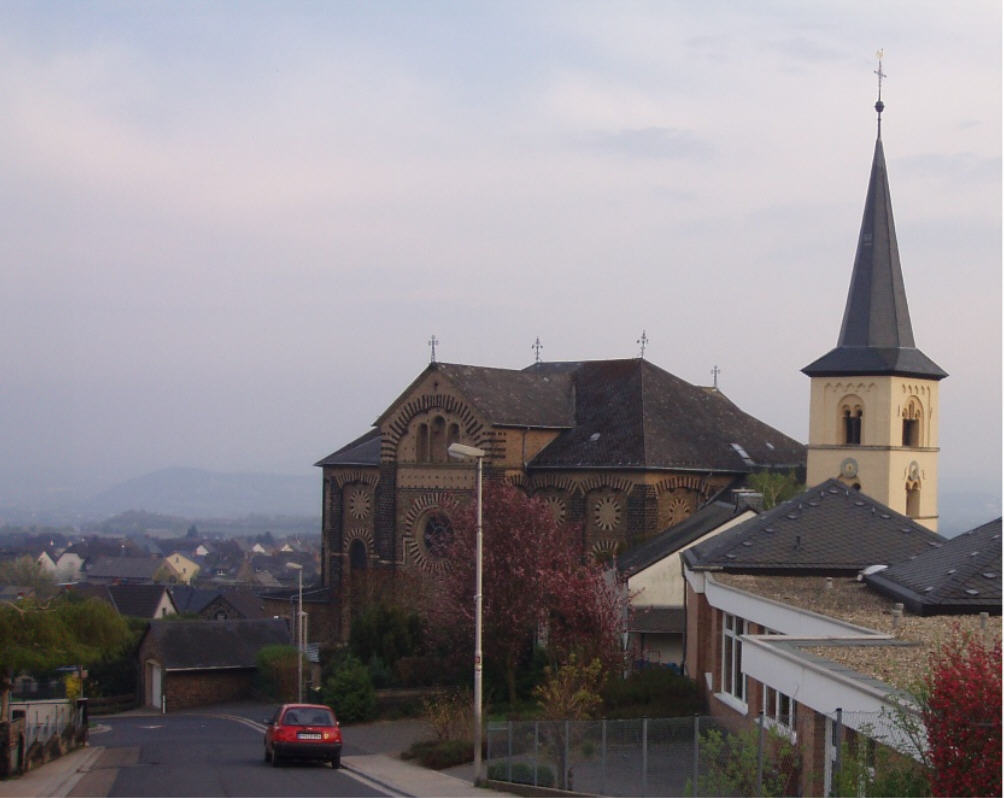
Church

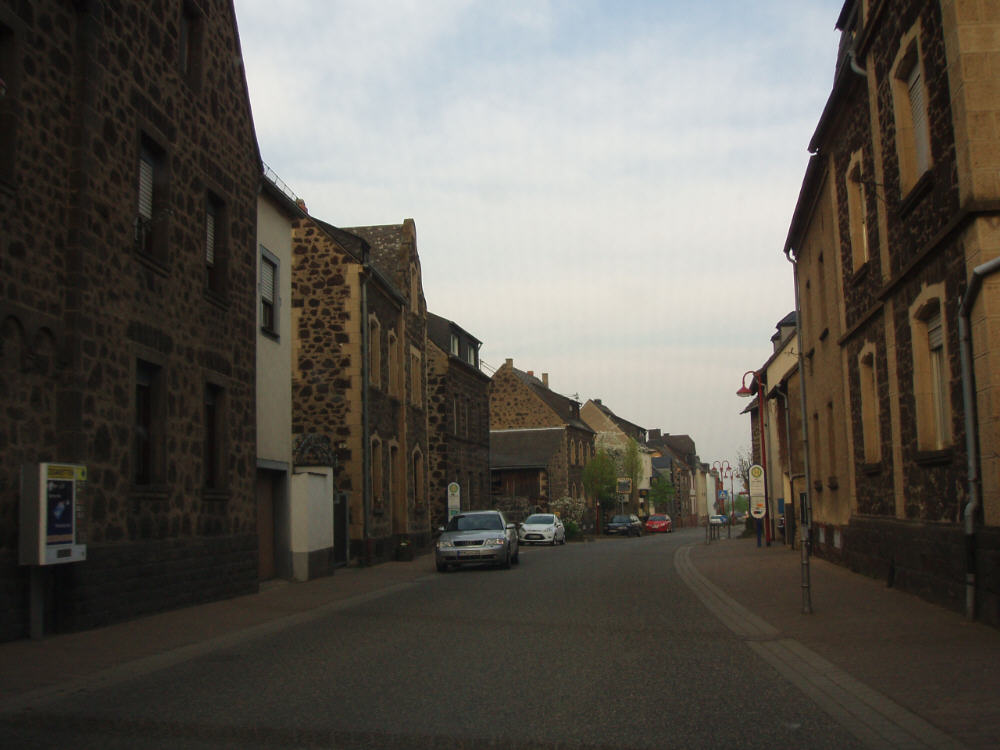
Street
