= Kretz, Rhineland-Palatinate =

- Municipality
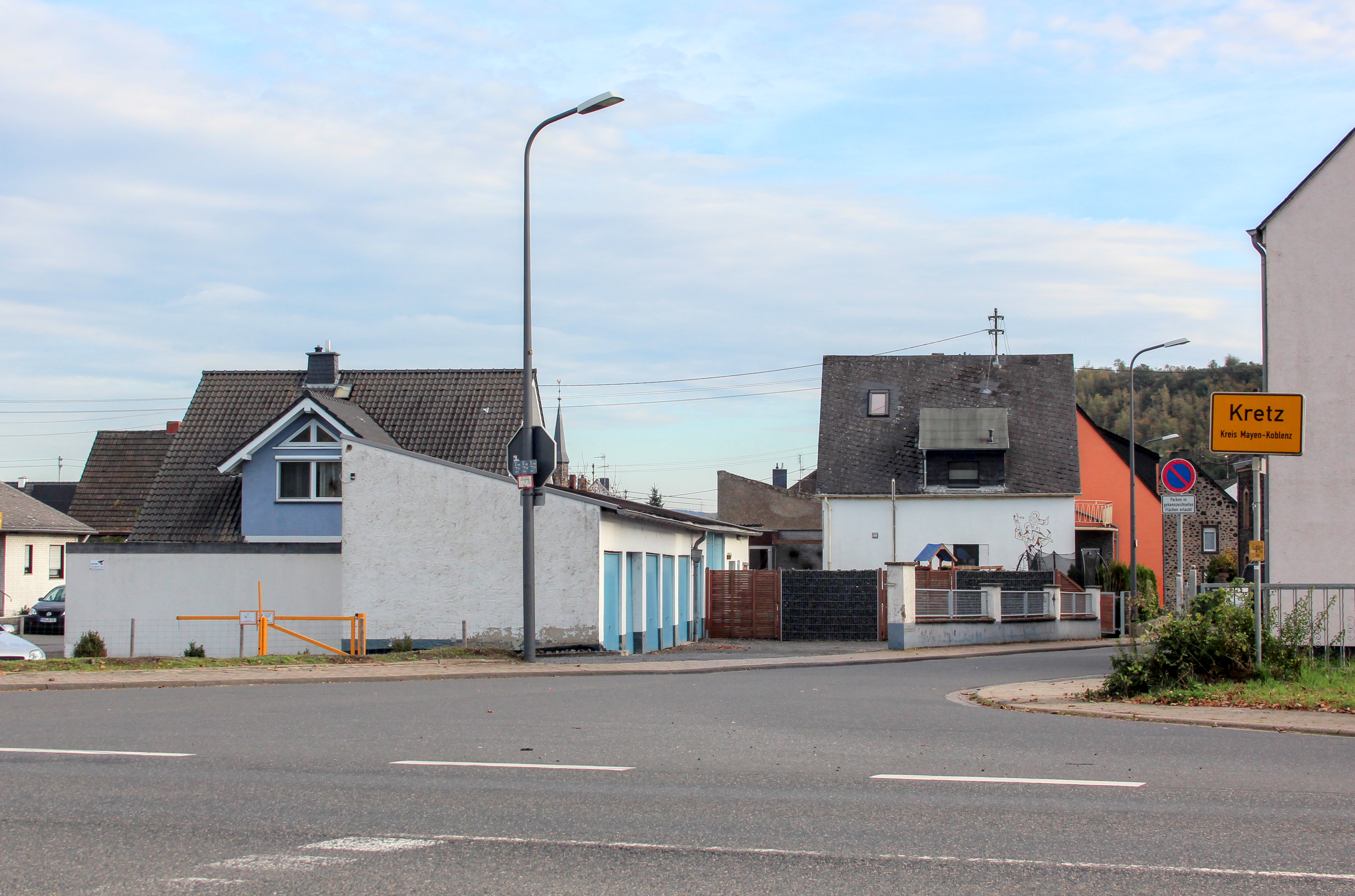

- Coat of arms

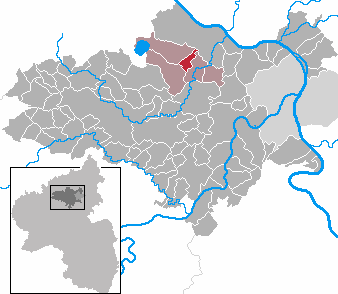
- Location of Kretz, Rhineland-Palatinate within Mayen-Koblenz district
- Interactive map of Kretz, Rhineland-Palatinate
- Location within Germany Location within Rhineland-Palatinate
- Coordinates: 50°23′45″N 7°21′42″E
- Country: Germany
- State: Rhineland-Palatinate
- District: Mayen-Koblenz
- Municipal assoc.: Pellenz

Government
  - Mayor (2019–24): Friedhelm Uenzen (CDU)

Area
  - Total: 4.18 km^{2} (1.61 sq mi)
- Elevation: 130 m (430 ft)

Population (2025-12-31)
  - Total: 739
  - Density: 177/km^{2} (458/sq mi)
- Time zone: UTC+01:00 (CET)
  - Summer (DST): UTC+02:00 (CEST)
- Postal codes: 56630
- Dialling codes: 02632
- Vehicle registration: MYK

Kretz (German pronunciation: [kʁɛts]) is a municipality in the district of Mayen-Koblenz in Rhineland-Palatinate, western Germany.
