= Kruft =

- Municipality
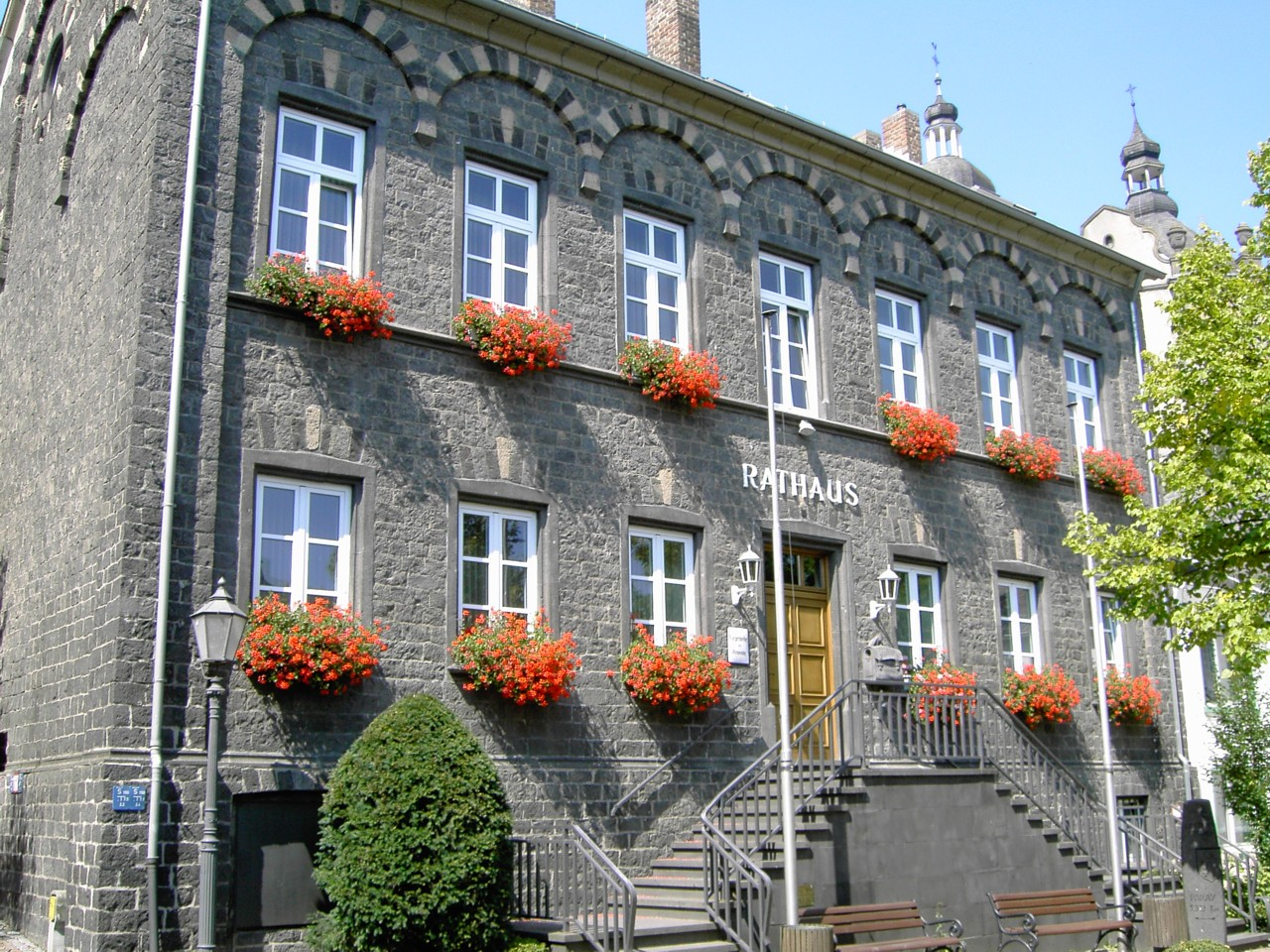
- Kruft town hall

- Coat of arms

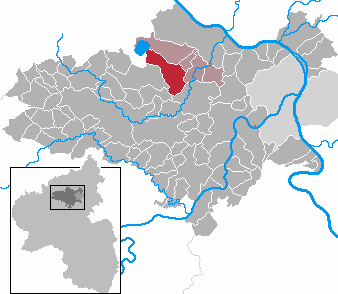
- Location of Kruft within Mayen-Koblenz district
- Interactive map of Kruft
- Location within Germany Location within Rhineland-Palatinate
- Coordinates: 50°23′11″N 7°20′15″E
- Country: Germany
- State: Rhineland-Palatinate
- District: Mayen-Koblenz
- Municipal assoc.: Pellenz

Government
  - Mayor (2019–24): Walter Kill (CDU)

Area
  - Total: 18.23 km^{2} (7.04 sq mi)
- Elevation: 150 m (490 ft)

Population (2025-12-31)
  - Total: 4,780
  - Density: 262/km^{2} (679/sq mi)
- Time zone: UTC+01:00 (CET)
  - Summer (DST): UTC+02:00 (CEST)
- Postal codes: 56642
- Dialling codes: 02652
- Vehicle registration: MYK
- Website: www.ortsgemeinde-kruft.de

Kruft (German pronunciation: [kʁʊft]) is a municipality in the district of Mayen-Koblenz in Rhineland-Palatinate, western Germany.

It is home to Laach Castle, a burgstall and former spur castle by the Laacher See lake.

== Transport ==
The Cross Eifel Railway has a station in Kruft which served by line RB23 (Limburg - Diez - Bad Ems - Koblenz - Andernach - Mayen) as well RB38 (Andernach - Mayen - Kaisersesch), both operated by section Lahn-Eifel-Bahn of Deutsche Bahn. Kruft is located in the zone number 324 of the transport association VRM.
