= Plaidt =

- Municipality
- Coat of arms

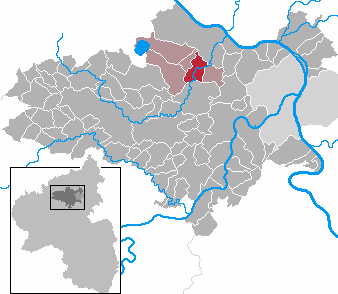
- Location of Plaidt within Mayen-Koblenz district
- Interactive map of Plaidt
- Location within Germany Location within Rhineland-Palatinate
- Coordinates: 50°3′25″N 7°23′22″E
- Country: Germany
- State: Rhineland-Palatinate
- District: Mayen-Koblenz
- Municipal assoc.: Pellenz

Government
  - Mayor (2019–24): Peter Wilkes (CDU)

Area
  - Total: 9.39 km^{2} (3.63 sq mi)
- Elevation: 107 m (351 ft)

Population (2025-12-31)
  - Total: 6,021
  - Density: 641/km^{2} (1,660/sq mi)
- Time zone: UTC+01:00 (CET)
  - Summer (DST): UTC+02:00 (CEST)
- Postal codes: 56637
- Dialling codes: 02632
- Vehicle registration: MYK
- Website: www.plaidt.de

Plaidt (German pronunciation: [plaɪt]) is a municipality in the district of Mayen-Koblenz in Rhineland-Palatinate, western Germany. It is seat of the Verbandsgemeinde Pellenz since 2017. Plaidt is situated south of Andernach.

== Transport ==
There's a local train stop of Cross Eifel Railway in Plait which served by line RB23 (Limburg - Diez - Bad Ems - Koblenz - Andernach - Mayen) as well RB38 (Andernach - Mayen - Kaisersesch), both operated by section Lahn-Eifel-Bahn of Deutsche Bahn. Plaidt is located in the public transport association VRM, in the zone number 308.
