= Polch =

- Town
- Coat of arms

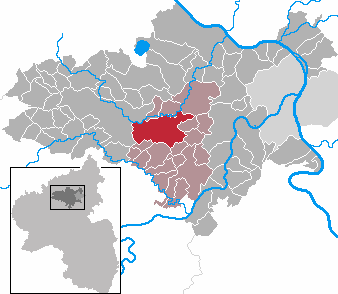
- Location of Polch within Mayen-Koblenz district
- Interactive map of Polch
- Location within Germany Location within Rhineland-Palatinate
- Coordinates: 50°18′04″N 7°19′00″E
- Country: Germany
- State: Rhineland-Palatinate
- District: Mayen-Koblenz
- Municipal assoc.: Maifeld

Government
  - Mayor (2019–24): Gerd Klasen

Area
  - Total: 28.68 km^{2} (11.07 sq mi)
- Elevation: 219 m (719 ft)

Population (2025-12-31)
  - Total: 6,659
  - Density: 232.2/km^{2} (601.4/sq mi)
- Time zone: UTC+01:00 (CET)
  - Summer (DST): UTC+02:00 (CEST)
- Postal codes: 56751
- Dialling codes: 02654
- Vehicle registration: MYK, MY
- Website: www.polch.de

Polch (German pronunciation: [pɔlç]) is a town in the district Mayen-Koblenz, Rhineland-Palatinate, Germany. It is part of the Verbandsgemeinde ("collective municipality") of Maifeld. It is situated east of Mayen.

Polch is twinned with the commune of Vineuil, located near Blois, Centre-Val de Loire, France

== Local council (Stadtrat) ==
Elections were held in May 2014:

Election	SPD	CDU	The Left	FWG Free voters	Total
2014	7	11	1	3	22 seats
2009	9	10	–	3	22 seats
2004	6	14	–	2	22 seats

- FWG = Freie Wählergruppe Polch e.V.

== Transport ==
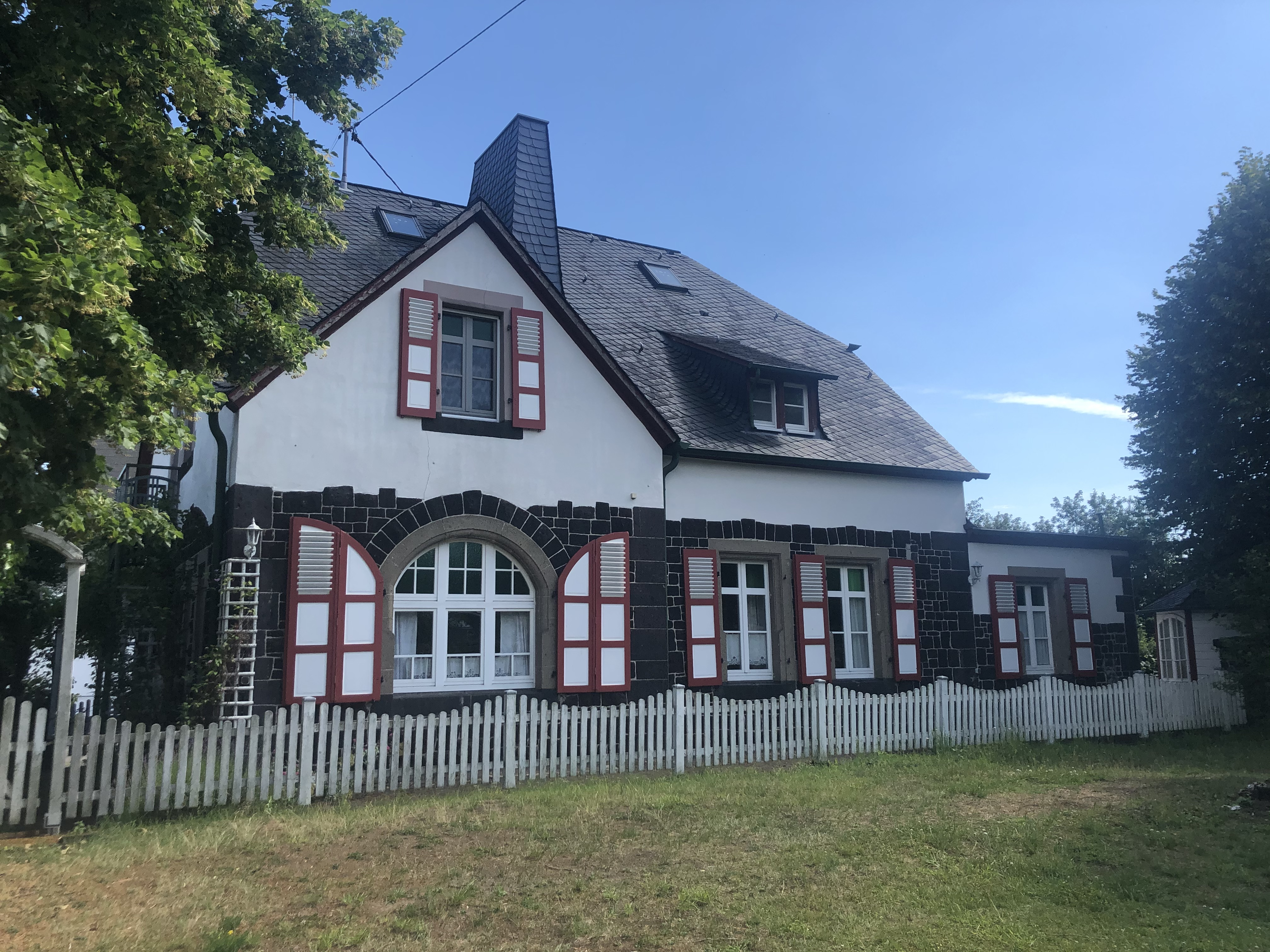
Former Polch train station

Polch is located in the area of the transport association Verkehrsverbund Rhein-Mosel (VRM), fare zone number 328 and served by local bus lines.

In the past, Polch was connected to local train service on the Koblenz-Lützel - Mayen Ist line.

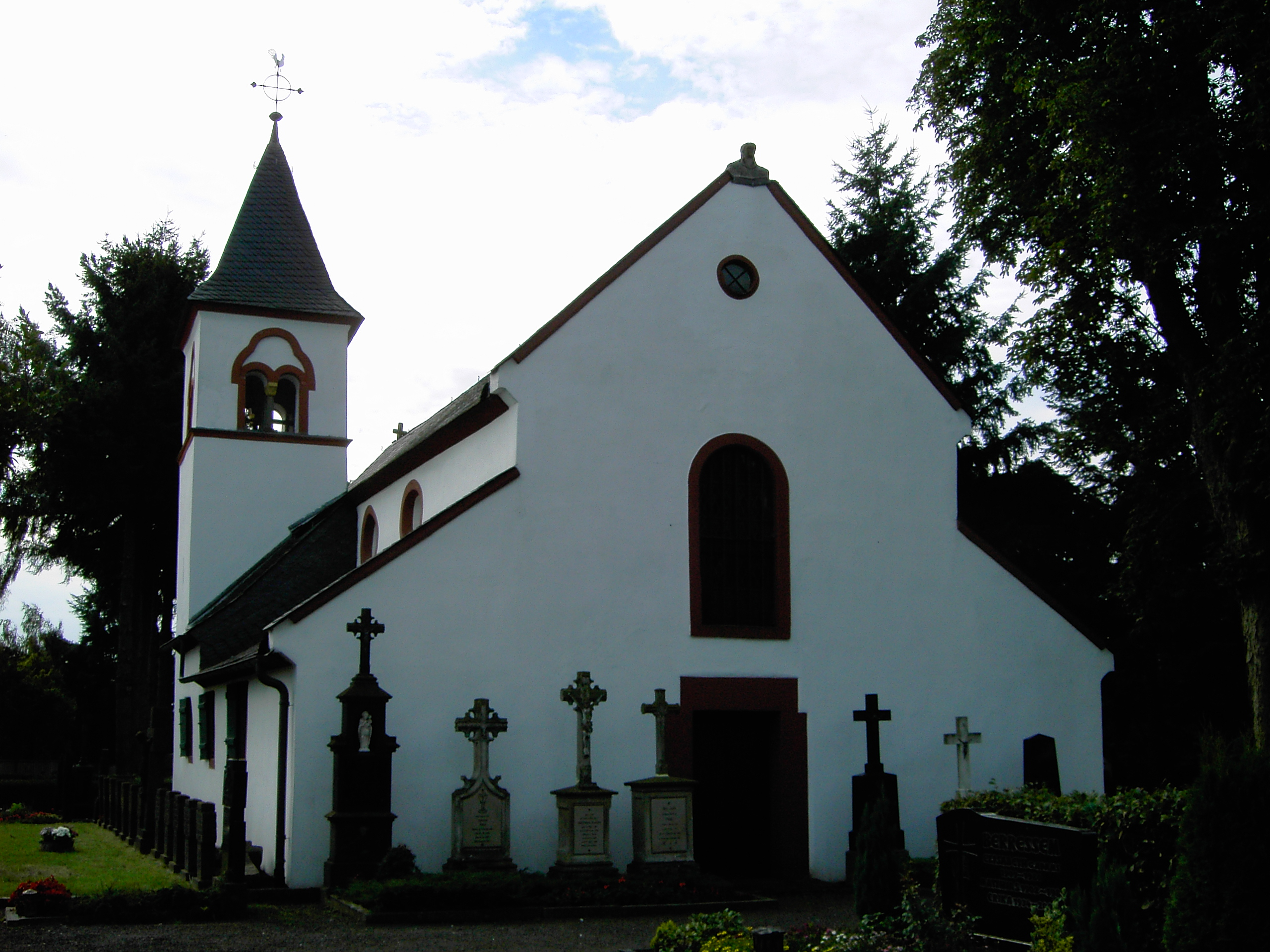
Saint George's church

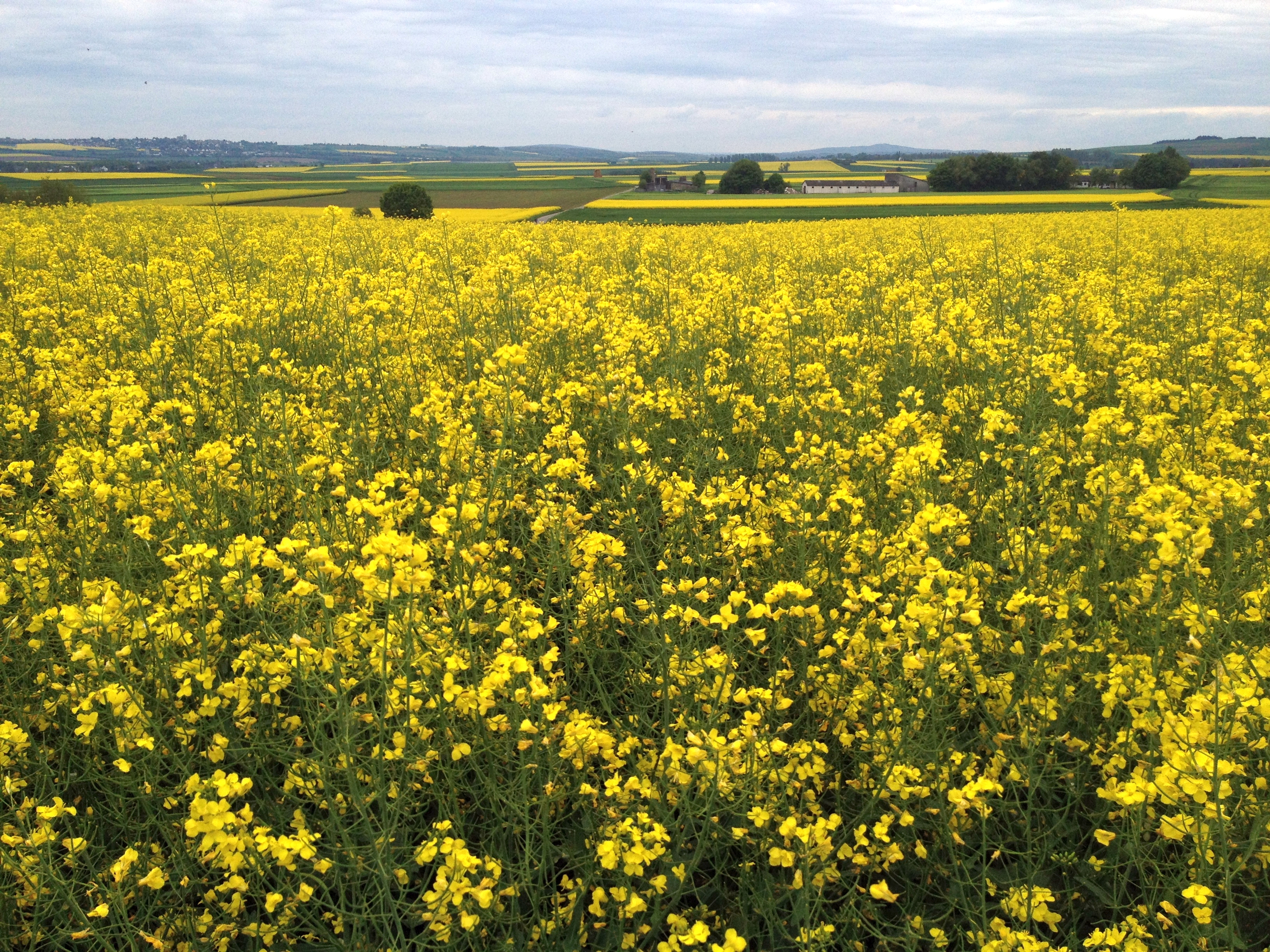
Canola field near Polch

== Notable people from Polch ==
- Sandro Holzem (born 2004), racing driver
