= Nette (Middle Rhine) =

River in Germany

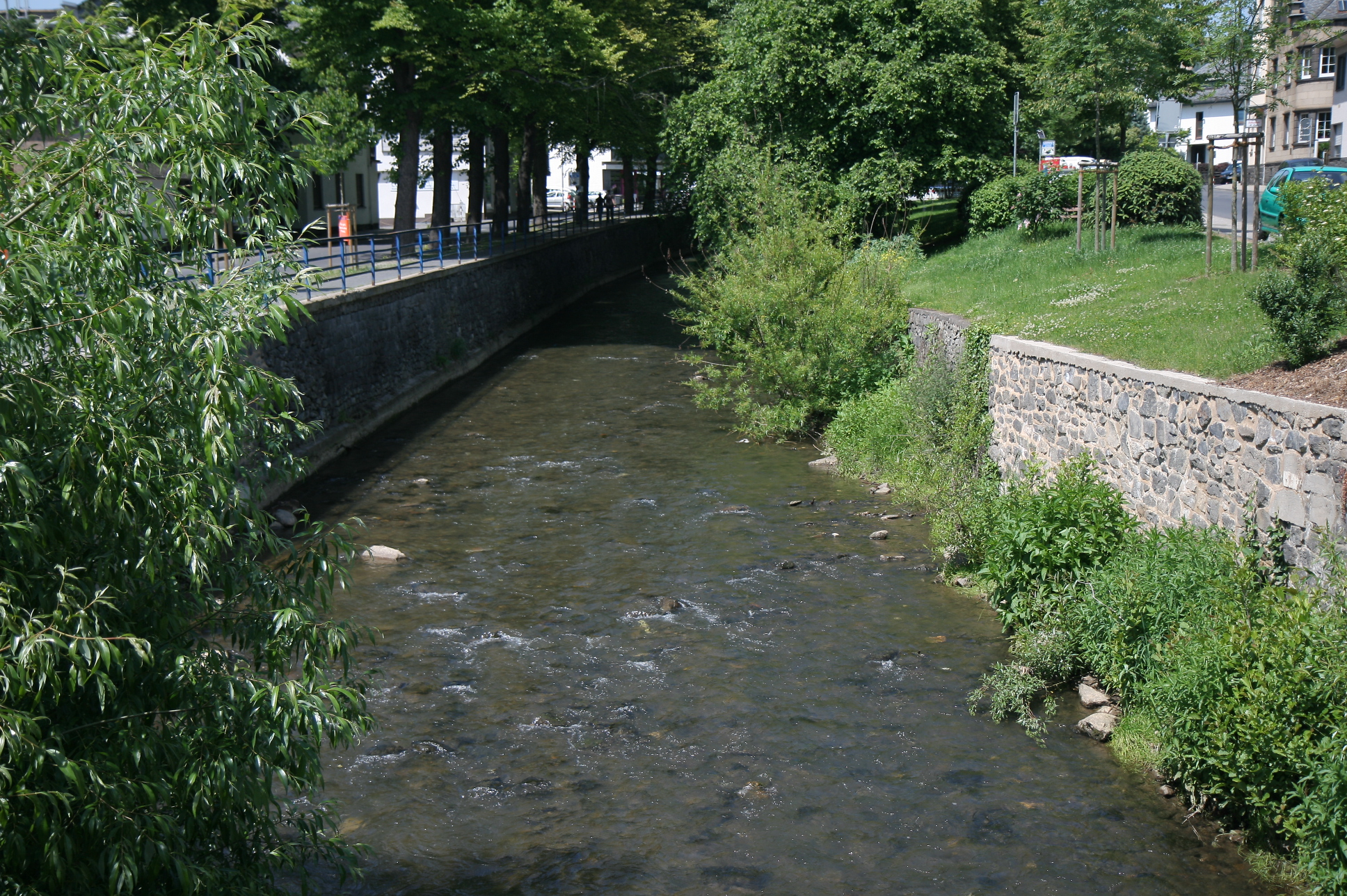
- The Nette at Mayen

Location
- Country: Germany
- State: Rhineland-Palatinate

Physical characteristics
- Source
  - coordinates: 50°26′0.8″N 7°5′23.7″E
  - elevation: 562 m (1,844 ft)
- Mouth
  - coordinates: 50°25′42″N 7°26′56″E
  - elevation: 59 m (194 ft)
- Length: 59.1 km (36.7 mi)
- Basin size: 372.398 km^{2} (143.784 sq mi)

Basin features
- Progression: Rhine→ North Sea

The Nette (German pronunciation: [ˈnɛtə]) is a small river in Rhineland-Palatinate, Germany, a left tributary of the Rhine. It rises in the Eifel, south of Nürburg. The Nette flows east through Mayen before reaching the Rhine between Weißenthurm and Andernach.

The Nette is not navigable and has otherwise no strategical importance. It is used in Mayen, among other things, as a supply of the local paper industry. It gives its name to the beer Nette Edel Pils, originally brewed in Weißenthurm (but now brewed in Bitburg by the Bitburger Brewery), and the Clinic Nette-Gut of Forensic Psychiatry at Weißenthurm.

== See also ==
- List of rivers of Rhineland-Palatinate
