= County of Virneburg =

Former county of the Holy Roman Empire

- 11th Century–1798
- Coat of arms

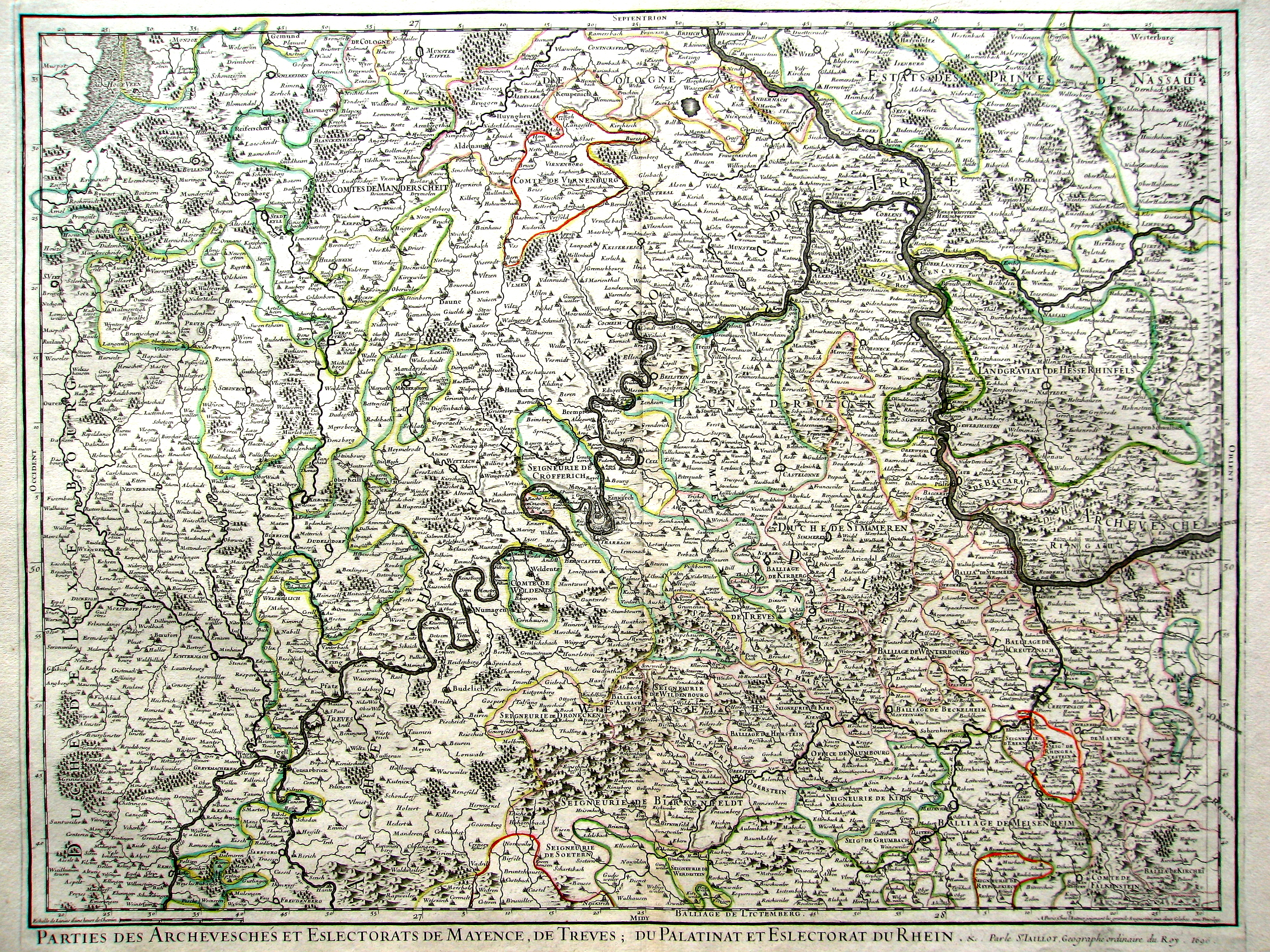
- Virneburg visible in a map from 1696. (A.-H. Jaillot)
- Status: State of the Holy Roman Empire
- Capital: Virneburg Castle
- Largest city: Virneburg
- Religion: Roman Catholicism
- Government: Feudal County
- Count of Virneburg
  - 11th Century: Bernhard
  - 1790-1812: John Louis
- Historical era: Middle Ages, Early Modern Period
  - Established: 11th Century
  - Disestablished: 1798
Succeeded by
Département de Rhin-et-Moselle
- Today part of: Rhineland-Palatinate

The County of Virneburg was a territory of the Holy Roman Empire in the region of the Eifel in present-day Rhineland-Palatinate.

== History ==
The Counts of Virneburg first appear in the 11th century as witnesses in documents. The administrative centre of the county and family seat was the eponymous Virneburg Castle. The history of the county is closely associated with that of the Counts Palatine of the Rhine, which until the 13th century in the so-called Pellenz possessed important lordship rights. Later the Counts of Virneburg were fief holders of the Counts Palatine. The further history of the county is characterized by the war of the Archbishops of Cologne and Trier with the Counts Palatine and the Virneburgern about the predominance in this region.

In 1288 Ruprecht II took part as tactical commander of the Brabanter in the Battle of Worringen.

In 1306 Count Ruprecht bought half of the County of Wied from Siegfried of Eppstein, who had inherited this region. The share fell already in the 14th century to Wilhelm of Braunsberg.

With Heinrich II of Cologne and Heinrich III of Mainz the Virneburger provided in the 14th century two archbishops.

In the 14th century various lordship rights went lost to the Trierer Archbishop Baldwin of Luxembourg. He took advantage of financial difficulties of the Virneburger. In 1419 Phillip of Virneburg married Katharina of Saffenburg, wherewith parts of the County of Neuenahr and the Lordship of Saffenburg reached the family of Virneburg.

In 1445 a division took place.

In 1545 the Counts of Virneburg died out with the death of Kuno of Virneburg. The true heirs were the Counts of Manderscheid. However, a large part of the estate was lost. In 1592 the Virneburger heritage fell to Löwenstein-Wertheim.

Until the end of the 18th century, the county remained as a fiefdom of the Electorate of Trier in the possession of the Counts of Löwenstein-Wertheim-Virneburg. Under French control in 1798, canton Virneburg was built out of the county, a canton which belonged to Arrondissement Bonn in the Département de Rhin-et-Moselle.

== Location and territory ==
The possessions of the Counts of Virneburg originated from a region around the castles Virneburg and Monreal and numerous other fiefdoms. Particularly important were the courts of Pellenz. They originated from the "great Pellenz", a region around Mendig, and the "little Pellenz", a region around Münstermaifeld. To the enlarged Pellenz-courts belonged the Beltheimer court, the court Bubenheim and the court Lonnig.

In the end of the 18th century belonged to the County of Virneburg the flecken Virneburg and the locations of Anschau, Arbach, Baar (Ober-, Mittel- and Niederbaar), Bereborn, Ditscheid, Freilingen (presently a part of Baar), Hirten, Kolverath, Lind, Lirstal, Luxem, Mannebach, Mimbach (presently a part of Anschau), Münk, Niederelz (presently a part of Weiler), Nitz, Oberelz, Retterath, Wanderath (presently a part of Baar), Weiler and Welcherath.

== Counts of Virneburg ==
=== Counts of Virneburg (ca 1052–1445) ===
The earliest Counts of Virneburg date back to the eleventh century.

- Bernhard, Count of Virneburg (died after 1052)
- Herman I, Count of Virneburg (died after 1112)
- Herman II, Count of Virneburg (died after 1157)
- Godfrey, Count of Virneburg (died after 1192)
- Frederik, Count of Virneburg (died after 1213), brother of Godfrey.
- Herman III, Count of Virneburg (died after 1238), probably the son of Godfrey, Count of Virneburg.
- Henry I, Count of Virneburg (died 1289), Son of Hermann III and Lukardis of Nassau, daughter of Rupert III.
- Robert II, Count of Virneburg (died 1308). Son of Henry I and his wife Ponzetta of Oberstein.
- Robert III, Count of Virneburg (died 1352). Son of Robert II and Kunigunde von Neuenahr.
- Gerard, Count of Virneburg (died 1379), son of Robert III.
- Adolf, Count of Virneburg (died 1384), son of Robert III.
- Robert IV, Count of Virneburg (died 1445), son of Adolf of Virneburg and Jutta van Randerode.

Other notable members of the Virneburg family:

- Heinrich II of Virneburg, the sixth son of Count Heinrich of Virneburg. Archbishop of Cologne from 1304 to his death in 1332.
- Heinrich III von Virneburg (died 21 December 1353), Archbishop and Elector of Mainz (1328/37–1346/53), son of Count Robert II of Virneburg and his wife Kunigunde of Neuenahr.
- Johann von Virneburg (died 23 June 1371) was a bishop of Münster from 1363 to 1364, and bishop of Utrecht from 1364 to 1371. Son of Robert III of Virneburg.

=== Counts of Manderscheid and Virneburg ===
- Francis, Count of Manderscheid and Virneburg (b. 1514 – d. 1548)
- Joachim, Count of Manderscheid and Virneburg (d. 9 Sep. 1582).
  - Anna Salome of Virneburg.
  - Elisabeth of Virneburg. Inherited Virneburg from her sister Anna Salome.

=== Counts of Löwenstein-Wertheim-Virneburg (1611–1812) ===
- Christopher Louis, Count of Löwenstein-Wertheim-Virneburg 1611–1618. Eldest son of Louis III, co-heir with his brothers. Became ruler of Virneburg through marriage with its heiress Elisabeth of Virneburg.
- Frederick Louis, Count of Löwenstein-Wertheim-Virneburg 1618–1657. Eldest son of predecessor.
- Louis Ernest, Count of Löwenstein-Wertheim-Virneburg 1657–1681. Eldest son of predecessor.
- Joachim Frederick, Count of Löwenstein-Wertheim-Virneburg 1681–1689. Eldest son of predecessor.
- Eucharius Kasimir, Count of Löwenstein-Wertheim-Virneburg 1689–1698. Younger brother of predecessor.
- Henry Frederick, Count of Löwenstein-Wertheim-Virneburg 1698–1721. Paternal first cousin of predecessor.
- John Louis Vollrath, Count of Löwenstein-Wertheim-Virneburg 1721–1790. Eldest son of predecessor.
- John Karl Louis, Count of Löwenstein-Wertheim-Virneburg 1790–1812. Title changed to Prince of Löwenstein-Wertheim-Freudenberg.

== Literature ==
- (in German) Iwanski, Wilhelm. Geschichte der Grafen von Virneburg. Von ihren Anfängen bis auf Robert IV. (1383). Koblenz 1912
- (in German) Brommer, Peter. Kleinere Territorien, Herrschaften und Teile auswärtiger Territorien. Nordteil. In: Franz-Josef Heyen (Hrsg.): Geschichte des Landes Rheinland-Pfalz Freiburg/Würzburg 1981, S. 67–76, S. 67–70.
- (in German) Europäische Stammtafeln Band VII (1979) Tafel 143 (Genealogy of the Counts of Virneburg).
