= Mayen-Koblenz =

Coordinates: 50°20′N 7°20′E

- District
- Flag Coat of arms
- Country: Germany
- State: Rhineland-Palatinate
- Capital: Koblenz

Government
  - District admin.: Alexander Saftig (CDU)

Area
  - Total: 817.1 km^{2} (315.5 sq mi)

Population (31 December 2025)
  - Total: 216,796
  - Density: 265.3/km^{2} (687.2/sq mi)
- Time zone: UTC+01:00 (CET)
  - Summer (DST): UTC+02:00 (CEST)
- Vehicle registration: MYK, MY
- Website: kvmyk.de

Mayen-Koblenz is a district (Kreis) in the north of Rhineland-Palatinate, Germany. Neighboring districts are (from north clockwise) Ahrweiler, Neuwied, Westerwaldkreis, district-free Koblenz, Rhein-Lahn, Rhein-Hunsrück, Cochem-Zell, and Vulkaneifel.

== History ==
The district was created in 1973 when the two districts, Mayen and Koblenz, were merged.

The district has been 'twinned' with the Borough of Waverley in Surrey in southern England since 1982.

== Geography ==
The two main rivers of the district are the Rhine and the Moselle, which join at the Deutsches Eck in Koblenz. In the west of the district are the Eifel mountains. These also include the large lake, the Laacher See, a volcanic caldera formed 12,000 years ago.

== Coat of arms ==
The coat of arms combine the elements of the two precursor districts. The tree, a Maie, is taken from the Mayen district. The wavy line represents the two rivers Rhine and Moselle. The crown is a reference to the fact that in Rhens the Councils of Electors took place to choose the emperors and kings of the Holy Roman Empire.

== Towns and municipalities ==
Verband-free towns
1. Andernach
2. Bendorf
3. Mayen

Verbandsgemeinden
1. Maifeld; 1. Einig; 2. Gappenach; 3. Gering; 4. Gierschnach; 5. Kalt; 6. Kerben; 7. Kollig; 8. Lonnig; 9. Mertloch; 10. Münstermaifeld^{2}; 11. Naunheim; 12. Ochtendung; 13. Pillig; 14. Polch^{1, 2}; 15. Rüber; 16. Trimbs; 17. Welling; 18. Wierschem; 2. Mendig; 1. Bell; 2. Mendig^{1, 2}; 3. Rieden; 4. Thür; 5. Volkesfeld; 3. Pellenz [seat: Plaidt]; 1. Kretz; 2. Kruft; 3. Nickenich; 4. Plaidt; 5. Saffig	4. Rhein-Mosel; 1. Alken; 2. Brey; 3. Brodenbach; 4. Burgen; 5. Dieblich; 6. Hatzenport; 7. Kobern-Gondorf^{1}; 8. Lehmen; 9. Löf; 10. Macken; 11. Niederfell; 12. Nörtershausen; 13. Oberfell; 14. Rhens^{2}; 15. Spay; 16. Waldesch; 17. Winningen; 18. Wolken; 5. Vallendar; 1. Niederwerth; 2. Urbar; 3. Vallendar^{1, 2}; 4. Weitersburg	6. Vordereifel [seat: Mayen]; 1. Acht; 2. Anschau; 3. Arft; 4. Baar; 5. Bermel; 6. Boos; 7. Ditscheid; 8. Ettringen; 9. Hausten; 10. Herresbach; 11. Hirten; 12. Kehrig; 13. Kirchwald; 14. Kottenheim; 15. Langenfeld; 16. Langscheid; 17. Lind; 18. Luxem; 19. Monreal; 20. Münk; 21. Nachtsheim; 22. Reudelsterz; 23. Sankt Johann; 24. Siebenbach; 25. Virneburg; 26. Weiler; 27. Welschenbach; 7. Weißenthurm; 1. Bassenheim; 2. Kaltenengers; 3. Kettig; 4. Mülheim-Kärlich^{2}; 5. Sankt Sebastian; 6. Urmitz; 7. Weißenthurm^{1, 2}
^{1}seat of the Verbandsgemeinde; ^{2}town

== Castles and palaces ==
The county has many castles and palaces:

- Eltz Castle, probably the best known German castle
- Trutzeltz Castle near Eltz Castle
- Schloss Bürresheim
- Genovevaburg in Mayen
- Oberburg, Kobern in Kobern with the Romanesque St. Matthew's Chapel
- Niederburg, Kobern in Kobern
- Schloss Liebieg in Gondorf
- Oberburg in Gondorf, family seat of the von der Leyen family
- Thurant Castle above Alken (Mosel)
- Ehrenburg near Brodenbach
- Sayn Castle and Schloss Sayn in Bendorf-Sayn
- Bischofstein Castle on the Moselle near Burgen
- Wernerseck Castle near Ochtendung
- Löwenburg and Philippsburg near Monreal
- Virneburg Castle
- Schloss Bassenheim in Bassenheim
- Namedy Castle in Andernach
- Andernach Castle in Andernach

== Transport ==
Verkehrsverbund Rhein-Mosel

Following railway lines are located partly in the Mayen-Koblenz district:

- Linke Rheinstrecke
- Rechte Rheinstrecke
- Cross Eifel Railway
- Engers-Au railway (between Engers and Siershahn also called Brexbacchtalbahn, currently no service, reactivation in planning)
- Koblenz–Trier railway
- Koblenz-Lützel - Mayen Ost railway (out of service)
- Polch-Münstermaifeld railway (out of service)

Mayen-Koblenz district is a member of the transport association Verkehrsverbund Rhein-Mosel (VRM).
