= Acht (Eifel) =

- Municipality
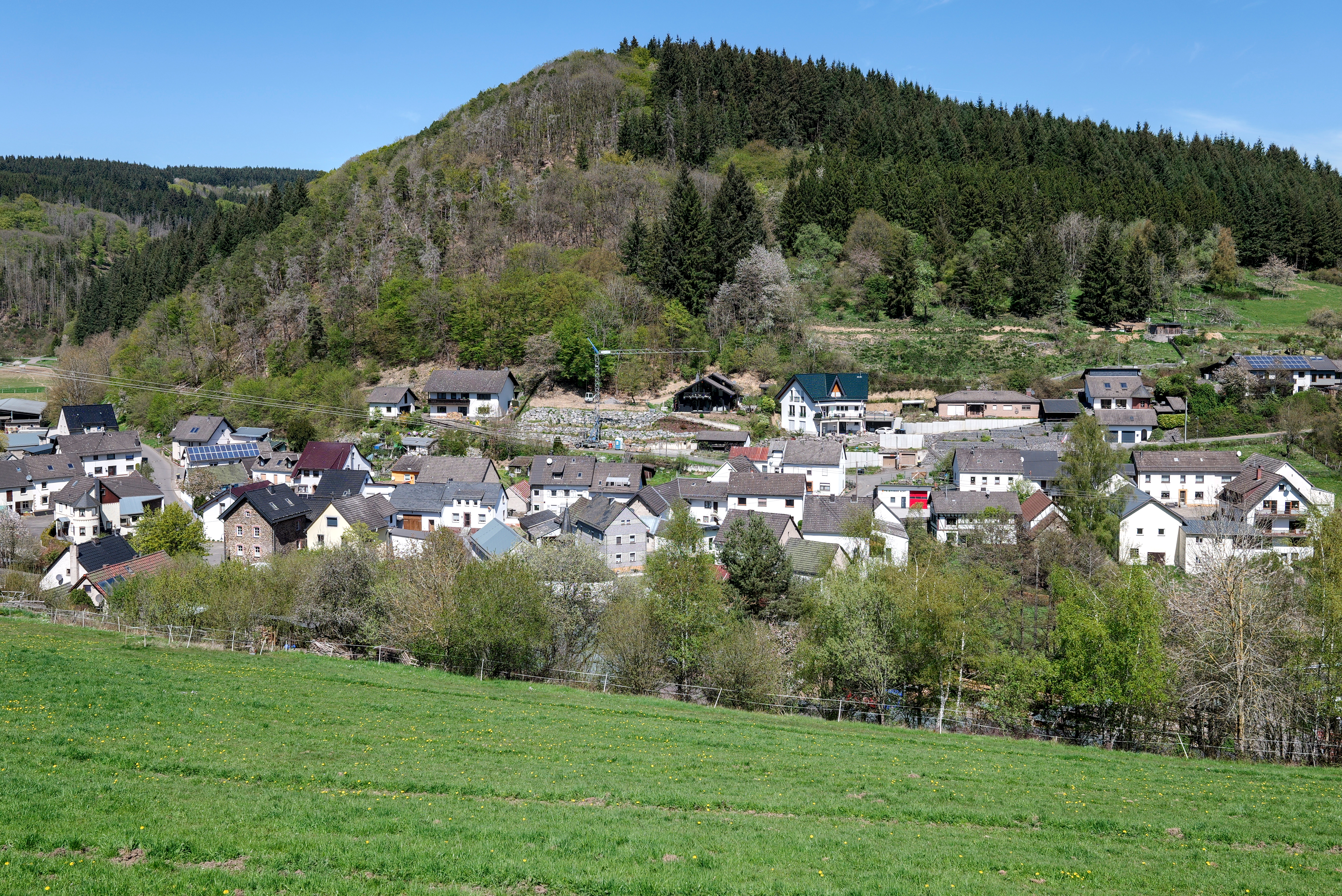

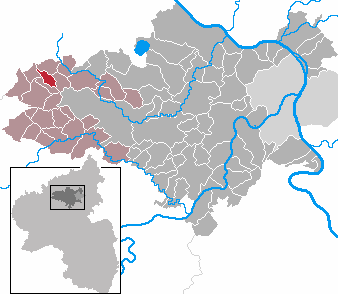
- Location of Acht within Mayen-Koblenz district
- Interactive map of Acht
- Location within Germany Location within Rhineland-Palatinate
- Coordinates: 50°22′13″N 7°4′21″E
- Country: Germany
- State: Rhineland-Palatinate
- District: Mayen-Koblenz
- Municipal assoc.: Vordereifel

Government
  - Mayor (2019–24): Helmut Thelen

Area
  - Total: 3.79 km^{2} (1.46 sq mi)
- Elevation: 430 m (1,410 ft)

Population (2025-12-31)
  - Total: 88
  - Density: 23/km^{2} (60/sq mi)
- Time zone: UTC+01:00 (CET)
  - Summer (DST): UTC+02:00 (CEST)
- Postal codes: 56729
- Dialling codes: 02656
- Vehicle registration: MYK
- Website: www.acht-eifel.de

Acht (German pronunciation: [axt]) is a municipality in the district of Mayen-Koblenz in Rhineland-Palatinate, western Germany. It is situated on the eastern edge of the Eifel.

Acht is part of Verbandsgemeinde of Vordereifel, whose head office is located in Mayen.

== Geography ==
Acht is located in the Achterbach valley the Eifel mountain range and is part of the landscape protection area "Rhei-Ahr-Eifel".

== History ==
The earliest known written records of the municipality are from 1110 CE.

On 10 June 2003 a category F3 tornado swept through the area, leading to the injuries of two individuals. Multiple buildings were also so badly damaged during the incident that they had to be completely demolished.

== Religion ==
88% of the inhabitants identify as catholic, 4% Protestant. Catholics belong to the parish of St. Quirinus with its residence being located in the neighbouring community of Langenfeld (Eifel), Diocese of Trier.

The few Protestants are part of the Protestant congregation of Adenau and attend the Erlöserkirche situated there.

== Politics ==
=== Municipal Council ===
The Gemeinderat consists of six councillors voted in following the local elections on 26 May 2019 via a majority voting system. The honorary local mayor was also chosen to be chairman.

=== Mayor ===
Helmut Thelen was elected as the local mayor of Acht on 25 July 2019. In the direct elections on the 26 May 2019 he achieved 70.49% of the vote and was elected for a five-year term. His predecessors were Werner Hilger and Nanny Vellguth.

=== Coat of arms ===
Original Blazon: „Unter goldenem Schildhaupt, darin ein blauer Wellenbalken, in Rot zwei goldene Hirschstangen, ein goldenes Kreuz einschließend.“

English Translation: "Beneath a golden shield-head, in it a blue waved bar, in red two golden stag antlers, enclosing a golden cross."

The stag antlers are a reference to the former patron of the local chapel, St. Hubertus.

The authority has used the crest since 1996.

== Attractions ==
Located centrally is the Catholic Chapel of St. Hubertus, a hall-type construction built in 1826. The wayside cross has earlier origins, in 1631.

There are two other wayside crosses: one from 1724 located in Hasenbaum, on the corner of Kirchenweg, and another from 1597 located to the north-east by the K 11 road.

== Literature ==
- Heimatbuch der Gemeinde Acht. Acht 2002
- Nachrichtliches Verzeichnis der Kulturdenkmäler Kreis Mayen-Koblen (PDF; 5.8 MB). Mainz 2017
