= Nitz, Germany =

Nitz
- Municipality
- Coat of arms

- Location of Nitz within Vulkaneifel district
- Interactive map of Nitz
- Location within Germany Location within Rhineland-Palatinate
- Coordinates: 50°20′05″N 07°01′16″E
- Country: Germany
- State: Rhineland-Palatinate
- District: Vulkaneifel
- Municipal assoc.: Kelberg

Government
  - Mayor (2019–24): Manfred Ant

Area
  - Total: 1.08 km^{2} (0.42 sq mi)
- Elevation: 425 m (1,394 ft)

Population (2025-12-31)
  - Total: 31
  - Density: 29/km^{2} (74/sq mi)
- Time zone: UTC+01:00 (CET)
  - Summer (DST): UTC+02:00 (CEST)
- Postal codes: 56729
- Dialling codes: 02656
- Vehicle registration: DAU
- Website: www.nitz-eifel.de

Nitz is an Ortsgemeinde – a municipality belonging to a Verbandsgemeinde, a kind of collective municipality – in the Vulkaneifel district in Rhineland-Palatinate, Germany. It belongs to the Verbandsgemeinde of Kelberg, whose seat is in the like-named municipality.

== Geography ==
=== Location ===
The municipality lies in the Vulkaneifel, a part of the Eifel known for its volcanic history, geographical and geological features, and even ongoing activity today, including gases that sometimes well up from the earth.

Nitz lies on the Nitzbach, a tributary to the river Nette. Some 3 km (1.9 mi) to the northwest are found the Nürburgring and the Hohe Acht, at 747 m (2,451 ft) above sea level the Eifel's highest mountain.

=== Neighbouring municipalities ===
Nitz's neighbours are Drees, Baar, Lind and Kirsbach.

== History ==
Nitz belonged in the Middle Ages to the County of Nürburg. In 1815, the village became Prussian and was administered by the Bürgermeisterei (“Mayoralty”) of Kelberg in the Adenau district. Since municipal reform in 1970, Nitz has belonged to the Verbandsgemeinde of Kelberg in the Vulkaneifel district (formerly called the Daun district).

== Politics ==
=== Municipal council ===
The council is made up of 6 council members, who were elected by majority vote at the municipal election held on 7 June 2009, and the honorary mayor as chairman.

=== Mayor ===
Nitz's mayor is Manfred Ant.

=== Coat of arms ===
The German blazon reads: Im silbernen Schild eine schrägrechte blaue Wellenleiste. In den Heroldstücken links eine rote Raute und rechts ein roter Adler.

The municipality's arms might in English heraldic language be described thus: Argent a bend wavy azure, dexter a lozenge gules, sinister an eagle displayed of the same, armed sable.

The German blazon does not mention the eagle's attitude, nor the different tincture seen in its claws and beak. It also reverses left and right, which are traditionally told from the armsbearer's point of view (that is, behind the shield), not the viewer's.

The grounds for the composition seen in these arms were the village's history of political division. For centuries, the namesake brook that runs through the village, the Nitzbach, stood as a boundary. Until relatively recently, the brook marked the boundary between two districts, Mayen-Koblenz and Daun, and at the same time that between two Regierungsbezirke, Trier and Koblenz. Until this arrangement was swept aside by administrative reform, municipal administration was divided at the brook, as were school boards and church parishes. Earlier still, the Nitzbach was the boundary between the respective lordly domains held by the Counts of Nürburg and the Counts of Virneburg. The bend wavy azure (that is, diagonal blue wavy stripe), of course, represents the Nitzbach. The two other charges are those once borne by these counts. The lozenge was the Virneburg armorial bearing, while the Nürburgs bore the eagle.

The arms have been borne since 18 December 1986.

== Culture and sightseeing ==
Buildings:

- Catholic branch church, Hauptstraße – small aisleless church, possibly from earlier half of 18th century, partly renovated in 1933 after a fire.
- Kapellenstraße 1 – timber-frame house, partly solid, 19th century.

Also worth seeing are two mills, the Freundsmühle and the Bauersmühle.

== Economy and infrastructure ==
Nitz is even today a mainly agriculture-based community.
