= Langscheid =

- Municipality
- Coat of arms

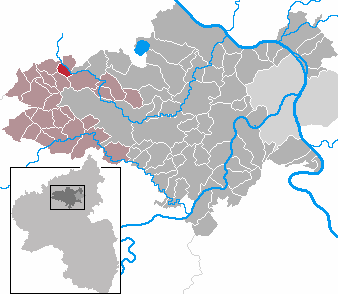
- Location of Langscheid within Mayen-Koblenz district
- Interactive map of Langscheid
- Location within Germany Location within Rhineland-Palatinate
- Coordinates: 50°22′50″N 7°6′34″E
- Country: Germany
- State: Rhineland-Palatinate
- District: Mayen-Koblenz
- Municipal assoc.: Vordereifel

Government
  - Mayor (2019–24): Gabriele Müller-Dewald

Area
  - Total: 2.54 km^{2} (0.98 sq mi)
- Elevation: 520 m (1,710 ft)

Population (2025-12-31)
  - Total: 97
  - Density: 38/km^{2} (99/sq mi)
- Time zone: UTC+01:00 (CET)
  - Summer (DST): UTC+02:00 (CEST)
- Postal codes: 56729
- Dialling codes: 02655
- Vehicle registration: MYK
- Website: langscheid-eifel.de

Langscheid is a municipality in the district of Mayen-Koblenz in Rhineland-Palatinate, western Germany.
