= Kehrig =

- Municipality
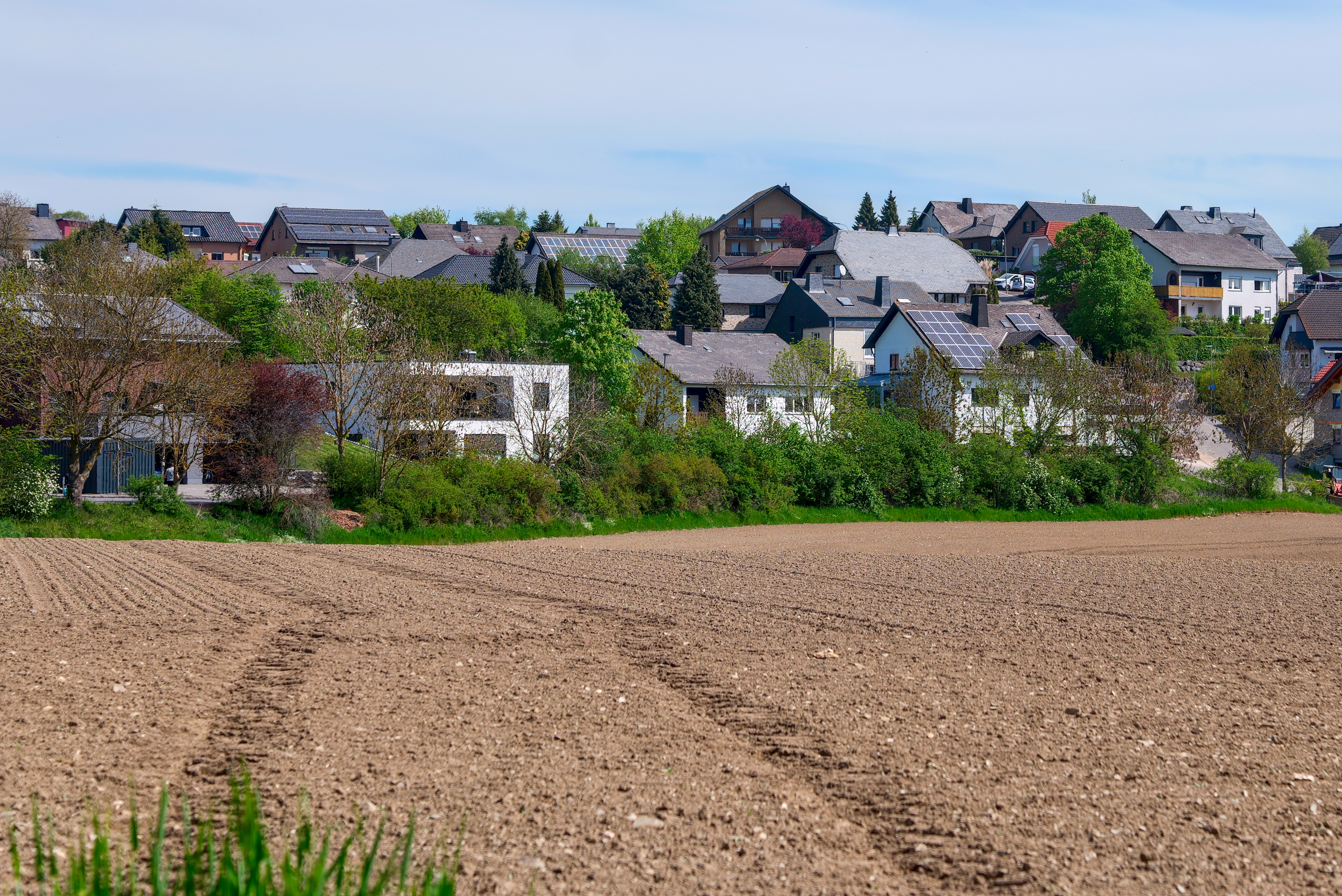

- Coat of arms

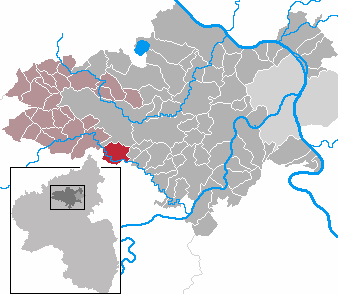
- Location of Kehrig within Mayen-Koblenz district
- Interactive map of Kehrig
- Location within Germany Location within Rhineland-Palatinate
- Coordinates: 50°16′56″N 7°13′40″E
- Country: Germany
- State: Rhineland-Palatinate
- District: Mayen-Koblenz
- Municipal assoc.: Vordereifel

Government
  - Mayor (2019–24): Stefan Ostrominski (CDU)

Area
  - Total: 10.38 km^{2} (4.01 sq mi)
- Elevation: 345 m (1,132 ft)

Population (2025-12-31)
  - Total: 1,225
  - Density: 118.0/km^{2} (305.7/sq mi)
- Time zone: UTC+01:00 (CET)
  - Summer (DST): UTC+02:00 (CEST)
- Postal codes: 56729
- Dialling codes: 02651
- Vehicle registration: MYK
- Website: www.kehrig-eifel.de

Kehrig (German pronunciation: [ˈkeːʁɪç]) is a municipality in the district of Mayen-Koblenz in Rhineland-Palatinate, Germany.
