= Herresbach =

- Municipality
- Coat of arms

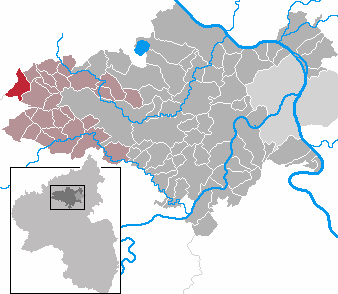
- Location of Herresbach within Mayen-Koblenz district
- Interactive map of Herresbach
- Location within Germany Location within Rhineland-Palatinate
- Coordinates: 50°21′32″N 7°1′13″E
- Country: Germany
- State: Rhineland-Palatinate
- District: Mayen-Koblenz
- Municipal assoc.: Vordereifel

Government
  - Mayor (2019–24): Achim Bürger

Area
  - Total: 8.47 km^{2} (3.27 sq mi)
- Elevation: 486 m (1,594 ft)

Population (2025-12-31)
  - Total: 473
  - Density: 55.8/km^{2} (145/sq mi)
- Time zone: UTC+01:00 (CET)
  - Summer (DST): UTC+02:00 (CEST)
- Postal codes: 56729
- Dialling codes: 02691, 02656
- Vehicle registration: MYK
- Website: www.herresbach-eifel.de

Herresbach (German pronunciation: [ˈhɛʁəsbax]) is a municipality in the district of Mayen-Koblenz, Rhineland-Palatinate, Germany.
