= Arft =

- Municipality
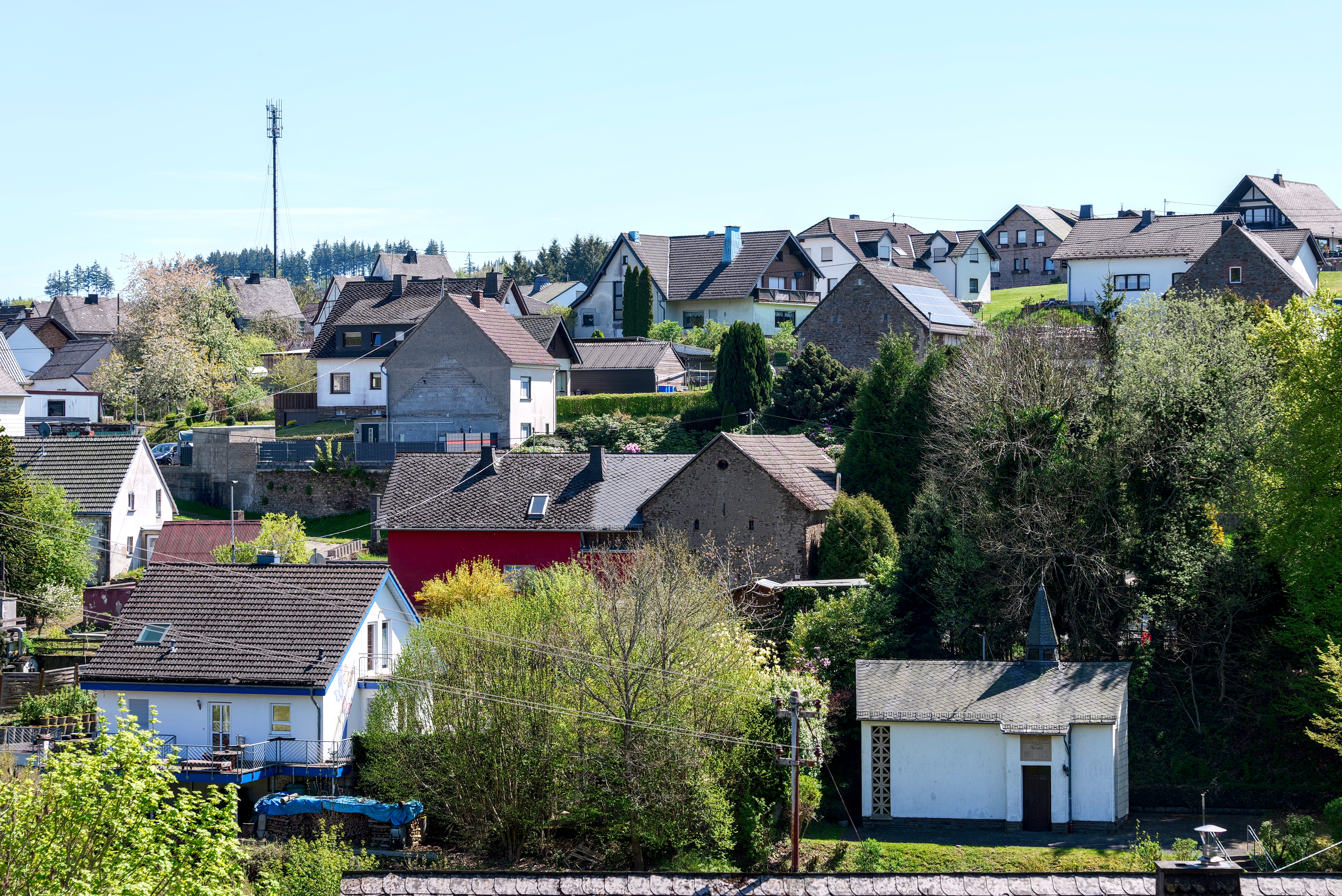

- Coat of arms

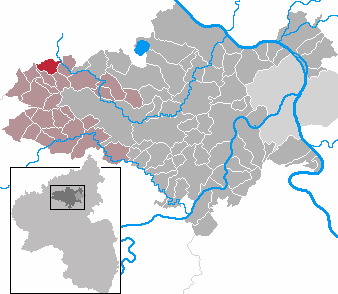
- Location of Arft within Mayen-Koblenz district
- Interactive map of Arft
- Location within Germany Location within Rhineland-Palatinate
- Coordinates: 50°23′04″N 7°5′03″E
- Country: Germany
- State: Rhineland-Palatinate
- District: Mayen-Koblenz
- Municipal assoc.: Vordereifel

Government
  - Mayor (2019–24): Lothar Waldorf

Area
  - Total: 5.83 km^{2} (2.25 sq mi)
- Elevation: 550 m (1,800 ft)

Population (2025-12-31)
  - Total: 224
  - Density: 38.4/km^{2} (99.5/sq mi)
- Time zone: UTC+01:00 (CET)
  - Summer (DST): UTC+02:00 (CEST)
- Postal codes: 56729
- Dialling codes: 02655
- Vehicle registration: MYK

Arft (German pronunciation: [aʁft]) is a municipality in the district of Mayen-Koblenz in Rhineland-Palatinate, western Germany.
