= Bermel =

- Municipality
- Coat of arms

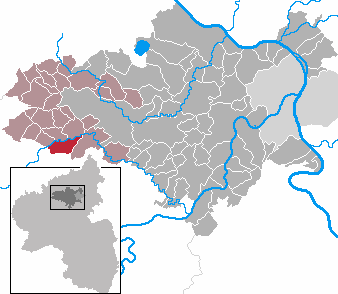
- Location of Bermel within Mayen-Koblenz district
- Interactive map of Bermel
- Location within Germany Location within Rhineland-Palatinate
- Coordinates: 50°17′05″N 7°5′20″E
- Country: Germany
- State: Rhineland-Palatinate
- District: Mayen-Koblenz
- Municipal assoc.: Vordereifel
- Subdivisions: 2

Government
  - Mayor (2019–24): Hans-Peter Isbert

Area
  - Total: 7.34 km^{2} (2.83 sq mi)
- Elevation: 400 m (1,300 ft)

Population (2025-12-31)
  - Total: 362
  - Density: 49.3/km^{2} (128/sq mi)
- Time zone: UTC+01:00 (CET)
  - Summer (DST): UTC+02:00 (CEST)
- Postal codes: 56729
- Dialling codes: 02657
- Vehicle registration: MYK
- Website: www.eifel.com/bermel

Bermel (German pronunciation: [ˈbɛʁml̩]) is a municipality in the district of Mayen-Koblenz in Rhineland-Palatinate, western Germany.
