= Kottenheim =

- Municipality
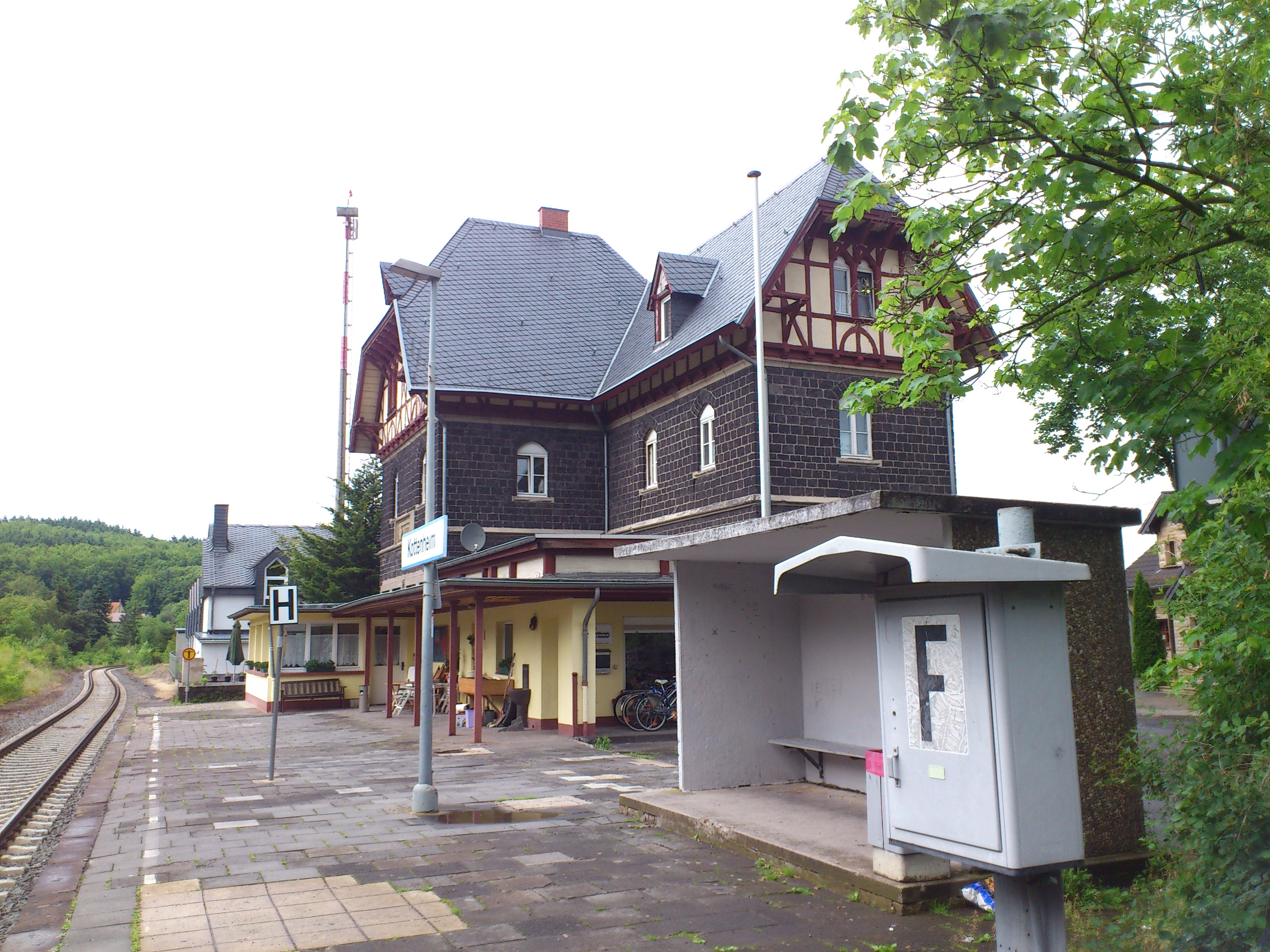
- Kottenheim train station

- Coat of arms

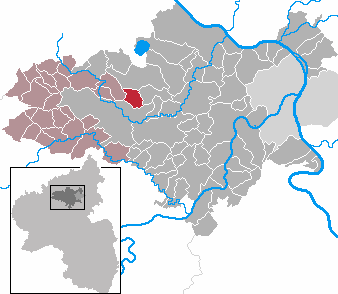
- Location of Kottenheim within Mayen-Koblenz district
- Interactive map of Kottenheim
- Location within Germany Location within Rhineland-Palatinate
- Coordinates: 50°21′01″N 7°15′23″E
- Country: Germany
- State: Rhineland-Palatinate
- District: Mayen-Koblenz
- Municipal assoc.: Vordereifel

Government
  - Mayor (2019–24): Thomas Braunstein (SPD)

Area
  - Total: 6.09 km^{2} (2.35 sq mi)
- Elevation: 194 m (636 ft)

Population (2025-12-31)
  - Total: 2,516
  - Density: 413/km^{2} (1,070/sq mi)
- Time zone: UTC+01:00 (CET)
  - Summer (DST): UTC+02:00 (CEST)
- Postal codes: 56736
- Dialling codes: 02651
- Vehicle registration: MYK
- Website: www.kottenheim.de

Kottenheim (German pronunciation: [ˈkɔtn̩haɪm]) is a municipality in the district of Mayen-Koblenz in Rhineland-Palatinate, western Germany.

== Transport ==
The trains of the Cross Eifel Railway are serving Kottenheim by lines RB23 (Limburg - Diez - Bad Ems - Koblenz - Andernach - Mayen) as well as RB38 (Andernach - Mayen - Kaisersesch),.both operated by section Lahn-Eifel-Bahn of Deutsche Bahn, the transport association Kottenheim is located in is VRM, zone number 386.
