= Vordereifel =

- Verbandsgemeinde
- Location of Vordereifel within Mayen-Koblenz district
- Interactive map of Vordereifel
- Location within Germany Location within Rhineland-Palatinate
- Coordinates: 50°20′N 7°13′E
- Country: Germany
- State: Rhineland-Palatinate
- District: Mayen-Koblenz
- Seat: Mayen
- Subdivisions: 27 municipalities

Area
  - Total: 167.67 km^{2} (64.74 sq mi)

Population (2025-12-31)
  - Total: 16,396
  - Density: 97.787/km^{2} (253.27/sq mi)
- Time zone: UTC+01:00 (CET)
  - Summer (DST): UTC+02:00 (CEST)
- Website: www.vordereifel.de

Vordereifel is a Verbandsgemeinde ("collective municipality") in the district of Mayen-Koblenz, in Rhineland-Palatinate, Germany. It is situated on the eastern edge of the Eifel, west of Mayen. The seat of the municipality is in Mayen, itself not part of the municipality.

The Verbandsgemeinde Vordereifel consists of the following Ortsgemeinden ("local municipalities"):

1. Acht
2. Anschau
3. Arft
4. Baar
5. Bermel
6. Boos
7. Ditscheid
8. Ettringen
9. Hausten
10. Herresbach
11. Hirten
12. Kehrig
13. Kirchwald
14. Kottenheim
15. Langenfeld
16. Langscheid
17. Lind
18. Luxem
19. Monreal
20. Münk
21. Nachtsheim
22. Reudelsterz
23. Sankt Johann
24. Siebenbach
25. Virneburg
26. Weiler
27. Welschenbach
