= Welschenbach =

- Municipality
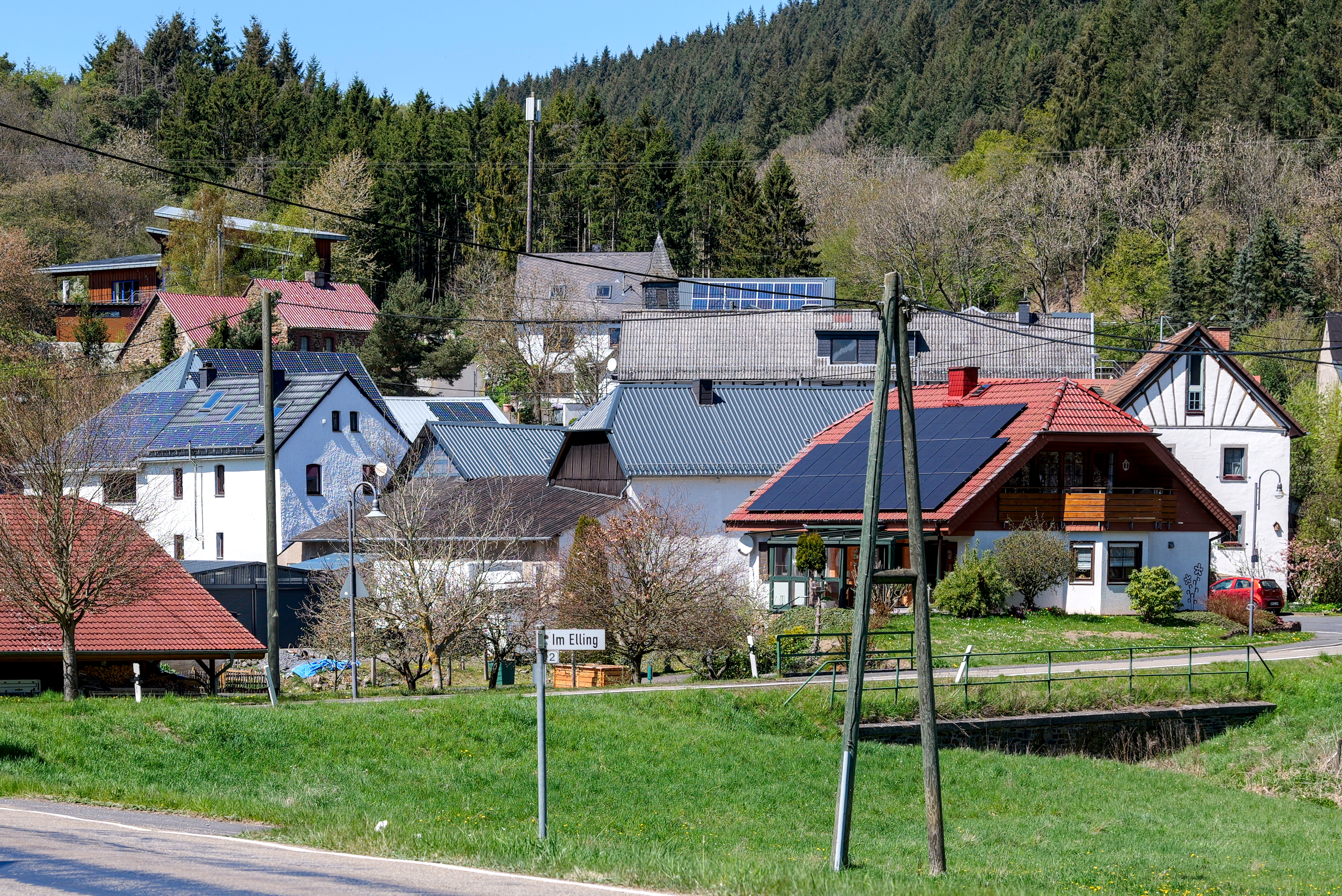

- Coat of arms

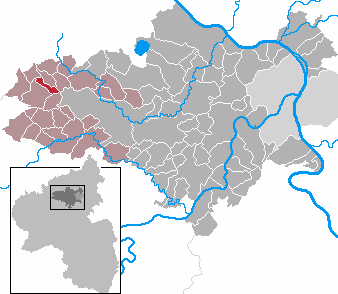
- Location of Welschenbach within Mayen-Koblenz district
- Interactive map of Welschenbach
- Location within Germany Location within Rhineland-Palatinate
- Coordinates: 50°21′50″N 7°03′51″E
- Country: Germany
- State: Rhineland-Palatinate
- District: Mayen-Koblenz
- Municipal assoc.: Vordereifel
- Subdivisions: 2

Government
  - Mayor (2019–24): Klaus Augel

Area
  - Total: 2.79 km^{2} (1.08 sq mi)
- Elevation: 450 m (1,480 ft)

Population (2025-12-31)
  - Total: 50
  - Density: 18/km^{2} (46/sq mi)
- Time zone: UTC+01:00 (CET)
  - Summer (DST): UTC+02:00 (CEST)
- Postal codes: 56729
- Dialling codes: 02656
- Vehicle registration: MYK
- Website: www.vordereifel.de

Welschenbach (German pronunciation: [ˈvɛlʃn̩bax]) is a municipality in the district of Mayen-Koblenz in Rhineland-Palatinate, Western Germany.
