= Siebenbach =

- Municipality
- Coat of arms

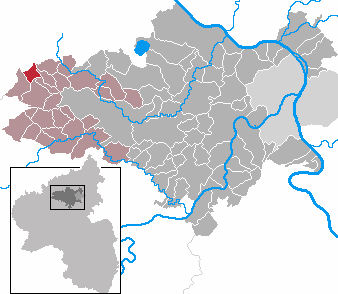
- Location of Siebenbach within Mayen-Koblenz district
- Interactive map of Siebenbach
- Location within Germany Location within Rhineland-Palatinate
- Coordinates: 50°22′49″N 7°2′16″E
- Country: Germany
- State: Rhineland-Palatinate
- District: Mayen-Koblenz
- Municipal assoc.: Vordereifel

Government
  - Mayor (2019–24): Helmut Schmitt

Area
  - Total: 3.41 km^{2} (1.32 sq mi)
- Elevation: 500 m (1,600 ft)

Population (2025-12-31)
  - Total: 184
  - Density: 54.0/km^{2} (140/sq mi)
- Time zone: UTC+01:00 (CET)
  - Summer (DST): UTC+02:00 (CEST)
- Postal codes: 56729
- Dialling codes: 02656
- Vehicle registration: MYK

Siebenbach (German pronunciation: [ˈziːbn̩bax]) is a municipality in the district of Mayen-Koblenz in Rhineland-Palatinate, western Germany.
