= Hausten =

- Municipality
- Coat of arms

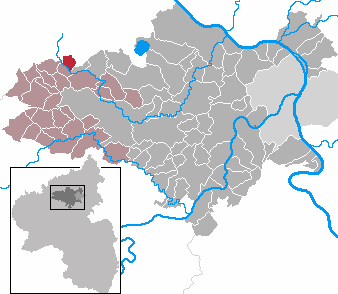
- Location of Hausten within Mayen-Koblenz district
- Interactive map of Hausten
- Location within Germany Location within Rhineland-Palatinate
- Coordinates: 50°24′04″N 7°7′06″E
- Country: Germany
- State: Rhineland-Palatinate
- District: Mayen-Koblenz
- Municipal assoc.: Vordereifel
- Subdivisions: 2

Government
  - Mayor (2019–24): Norbert Klapperich

Area
  - Total: 3.56 km^{2} (1.37 sq mi)
- Elevation: 418 m (1,371 ft)

Population (2025-12-31)
  - Total: 373
  - Density: 105/km^{2} (271/sq mi)
- Time zone: UTC+01:00 (CET)
  - Summer (DST): UTC+02:00 (CEST)
- Postal codes: 56745
- Dialling codes: 02655
- Vehicle registration: MYK

Hausten (German pronunciation: [ˈhaʊstn̩]) is a municipality in the district of Mayen-Koblenz in Rhineland-Palatinate, western Germany.
