= Ettringen, Mayen-Koblenz =

Location in Rhineland-Palatinate, Germany

Ettringen
- Municipality
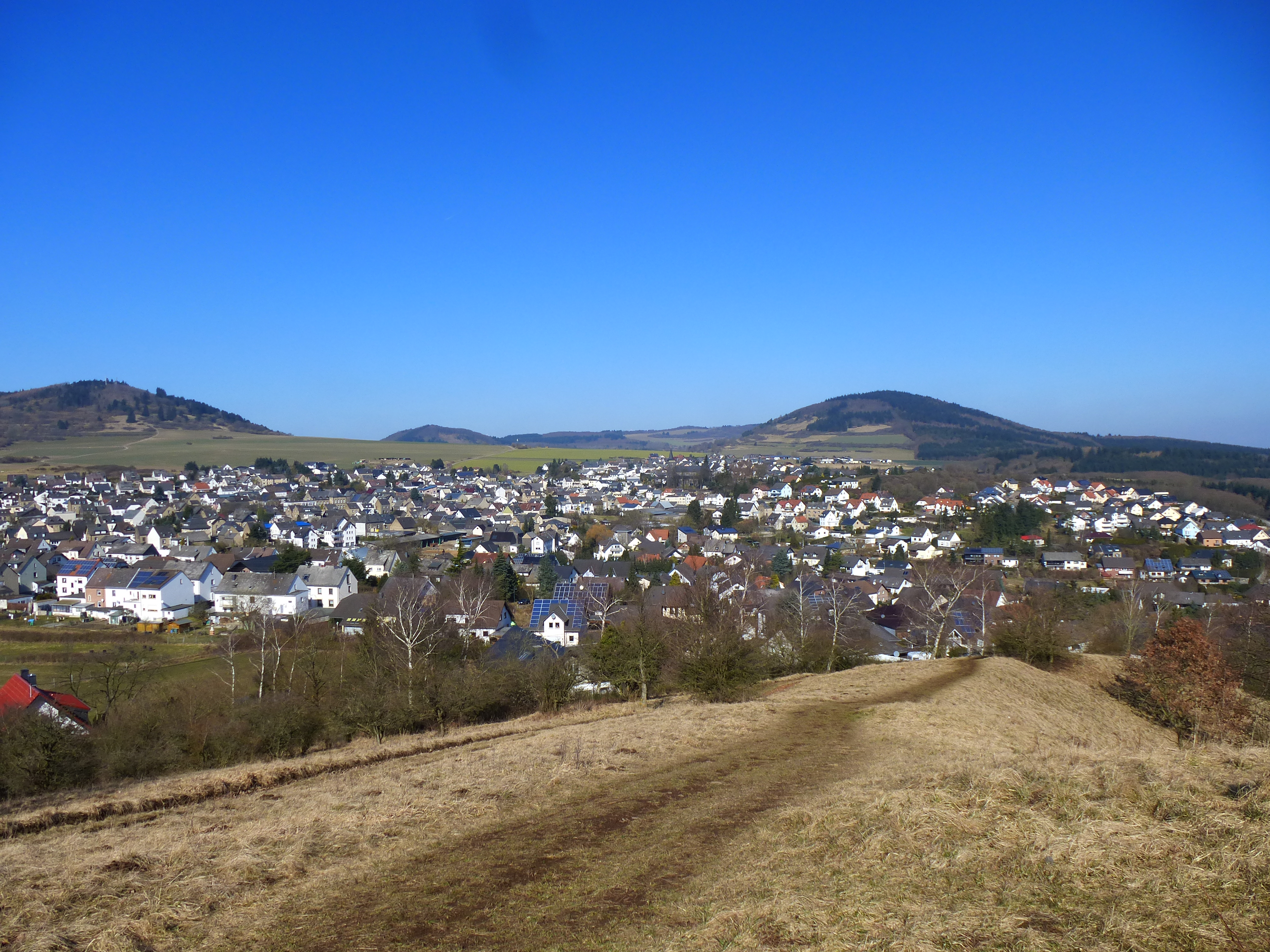
- Ettringen seen from the southeast

- Coat of arms

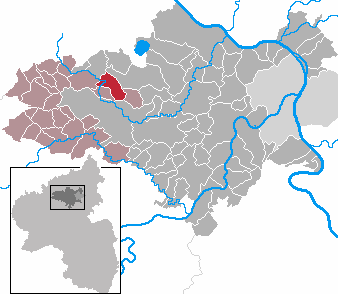
- Location of Ettringen within Mayen-Koblenz district
- Interactive map of Ettringen
- Location within Germany Location within Rhineland-Palatinate
- Coordinates: 50°21′32″N 7°13′17″E
- Country: Germany
- State: Rhineland-Palatinate
- District: Mayen-Koblenz
- Municipal assoc.: Vordereifel

Government
  - Mayor (2019–24): Werner Spitzley (CDU)

Area
  - Total: 9.15 km^{2} (3.53 sq mi)
- Elevation: 400 m (1,300 ft)

Population (2025-12-31)
  - Total: 2,876
  - Density: 314/km^{2} (814/sq mi)
- Time zone: UTC+01:00 (CET)
  - Summer (DST): UTC+02:00 (CEST)
- Postal codes: 56729
- Dialling codes: 02651
- Vehicle registration: MYK
- Website: www.ettringen-eifel.de

Ettringen (German pronunciation: [ˈɛtʁɪŋən]) is a municipality in the district of Mayen-Koblenz in Rhineland-Palatinate, western Germany.

The nearby abandoned stone quarry Ettringer Lay serves as a popular climbing area of the German Alpine Club (DAV) with more than 790 routes set in the basalt walls.

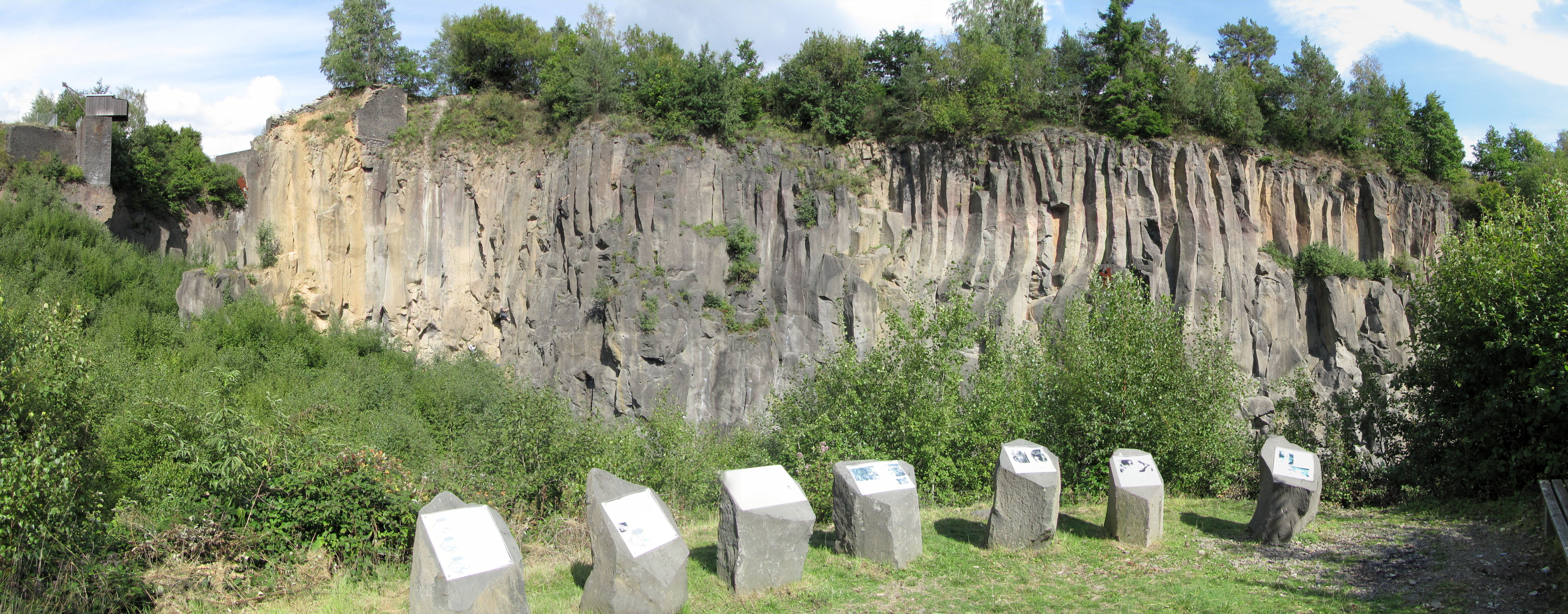
Basalt walls of the Ettringer Lay
