= Kirchwald =

- Municipality
- Coat of arms

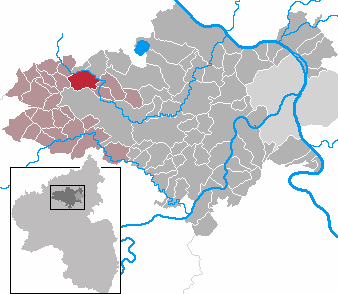
- Location of Kirchwald within Mayen-Koblenz district
- Interactive map of Kirchwald
- Location within Germany Location within Rhineland-Palatinate
- Coordinates: 50°22′13″N 7°9′15″E
- Country: Germany
- State: Rhineland-Palatinate
- District: Mayen-Koblenz
- Municipal assoc.: Vordereifel
- Subdivisions: 2

Government
  - Mayor (2019–24): Arwin Seiwert

Area
  - Total: 9.51 km^{2} (3.67 sq mi)
- Elevation: 300–577 m (984–1,893 ft)

Population (2025-12-31)
  - Total: 980
  - Density: 100/km^{2} (270/sq mi)
- Time zone: UTC+01:00 (CET)
  - Summer (DST): UTC+02:00 (CEST)
- Postal codes: 56729
- Dialling codes: 02651
- Vehicle registration: MYK
- Website: www.kirchwald.de

Kirchwald (German pronunciation: [ˈkɪʁçvalt]) is a municipality in the district of Mayen-Koblenz in Rhineland-Palatinate, western Germany.
