= Reudelsterz =

- Municipality
- Coat of arms

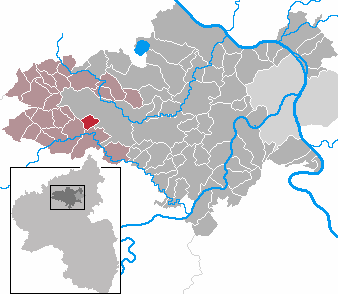
- Location of Reudelsterz within Mayen-Koblenz district
- Interactive map of Reudelsterz
- Location within Germany Location within Rhineland-Palatinate
- Coordinates: 50°19′05″N 7°9′21″E
- Country: Germany
- State: Rhineland-Palatinate
- District: Mayen-Koblenz
- Municipal assoc.: Vordereifel

Government
  - Mayor (2019–24): Thomas Stolz

Area
  - Total: 3.94 km^{2} (1.52 sq mi)
- Elevation: 425 m (1,394 ft)

Population (2025-12-31)
  - Total: 373
  - Density: 94.7/km^{2} (245/sq mi)
- Time zone: UTC+01:00 (CET)
  - Summer (DST): UTC+02:00 (CEST)
- Postal codes: 56727
- Dialling codes: 02651
- Vehicle registration: MYK

Reudelsterz is a municipality in the district of Mayen-Koblenz in Rhineland-Palatinate, western Germany.
