= Nachtsheim =

- Municipality
- Coat of arms

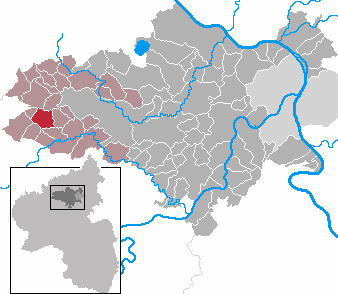
- Location of Nachtsheim within Mayen-Koblenz district
- Interactive map of Nachtsheim
- Location within Germany Location within Rhineland-Palatinate
- Coordinates: 50°19′8″N 7°3′57″E
- Country: Germany
- State: Rhineland-Palatinate
- District: Mayen-Koblenz
- Municipal assoc.: Vordereifel

Government
  - Mayor (2019–24): Martin Schmitt

Area
  - Total: 7.22 km^{2} (2.79 sq mi)
- Elevation: 490 m (1,610 ft)

Population (2025-12-31)
  - Total: 559
  - Density: 77.4/km^{2} (201/sq mi)
- Time zone: UTC+01:00 (CET)
  - Summer (DST): UTC+02:00 (CEST)
- Postal codes: 56729
- Dialling codes: 02656
- Vehicle registration: MYK
- Website: nachtsheim.info

Nachtsheim (German pronunciation: [ˈnaxtshaɪm]) is a municipality in the district of Mayen-Koblenz in Rhineland-Palatinate, western Germany.
