= Hirten =

- Municipality
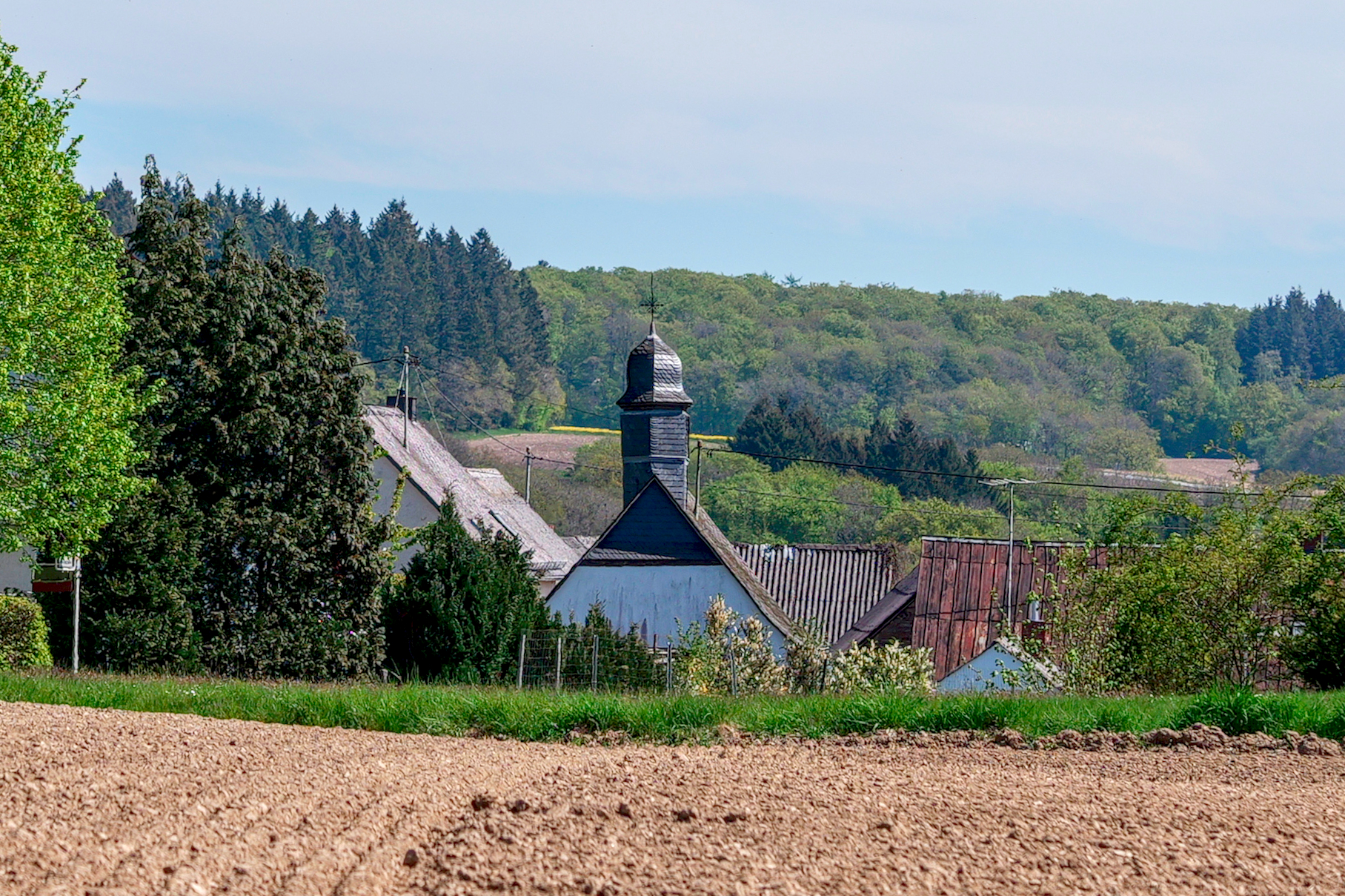

- Coat of arms

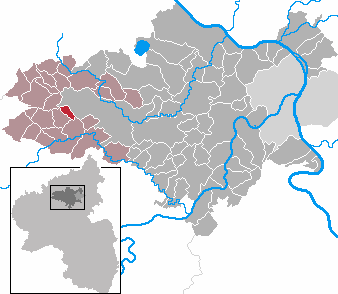
- Location of Hirten within Mayen-Koblenz district
- Interactive map of Hirten
- Location within Germany Location within Rhineland-Palatinate
- Coordinates: 50°19′39″N 7°6′50″E
- Country: Germany
- State: Rhineland-Palatinate
- District: Mayen-Koblenz
- Municipal assoc.: Vordereifel
- Subdivisions: 2

Government
  - Mayor (2019–24): Werner Engels

Area
  - Total: 2.51 km^{2} (0.97 sq mi)
- Elevation: 470 m (1,540 ft)

Population (2025-12-31)
  - Total: 262
  - Density: 104/km^{2} (270/sq mi)
- Time zone: UTC+01:00 (CET)
  - Summer (DST): UTC+02:00 (CEST)
- Postal codes: 56729
- Dialling codes: 02656
- Vehicle registration: MYK
- Website: www.hirten-eifel.de

Hirten (German pronunciation: [ˈhɪʁtn̩]) is a municipality in the district of Mayen-Koblenz in Rhineland-Palatinate, western Germany.
