= Weiler, Mayen-Koblenz =

Weiler
- Municipality
- Coat of arms

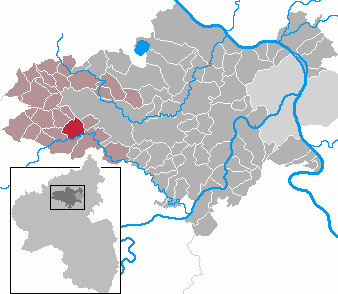
- Location of Weiler within Mayen-Koblenz district
- Interactive map of Weiler
- Location within Germany Location within Rhineland-Palatinate
- Coordinates: 50°18′37″N 7°07′08″E
- Country: Germany
- State: Rhineland-Palatinate
- District: Mayen-Koblenz
- Municipal assoc.: Vordereifel
- Subdivisions: 2

Government
  - Mayor (2019–24): Fabian Steffens

Area
  - Total: 7.51 km^{2} (2.90 sq mi)
- Elevation: 400 m (1,300 ft)

Population (2025-12-31)
  - Total: 508
  - Density: 67.6/km^{2} (175/sq mi)
- Time zone: UTC+01:00 (CET)
  - Summer (DST): UTC+02:00 (CEST)
- Postal codes: 56729
- Dialling codes: 02656
- Vehicle registration: MYK
- Website: weiler-eifel.de

Weiler (German pronunciation: [ˈvaɪlɐ]) is a municipality in the district of Mayen-Koblenz in Rhineland-Palatinate, western Germany.
