= Langenfeld, Mayen-Koblenz =

Langenfeld
- Municipality
- Coat of arms

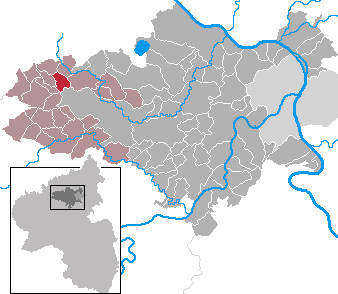
- Location of Langenfeld within Mayen-Koblenz district
- Interactive map of Langenfeld
- Location within Germany Location within Rhineland-Palatinate
- Coordinates: 50°22′35″N 7°5′38″E
- Country: Germany
- State: Rhineland-Palatinate
- District: Mayen-Koblenz
- Municipal assoc.: Vordereifel

Government
  - Mayor (2019–24): Christian Müller

Area
  - Total: 4.71 km^{2} (1.82 sq mi)
- Elevation: 550 m (1,800 ft)

Population (2025-12-31)
  - Total: 673
  - Density: 143/km^{2} (370/sq mi)
- Time zone: UTC+01:00 (CET)
  - Summer (DST): UTC+02:00 (CEST)
- Postal codes: 56729
- Dialling codes: 02655
- Vehicle registration: MYK
- Website: www.langenfeld-eifel.de

Langenfeld (German pronunciation: [ˈlaŋənfɛlt]) is a municipality in the district of Mayen-Koblenz in Rhineland-Palatinate, western Germany.
