= Bürresheim Castle =

Château

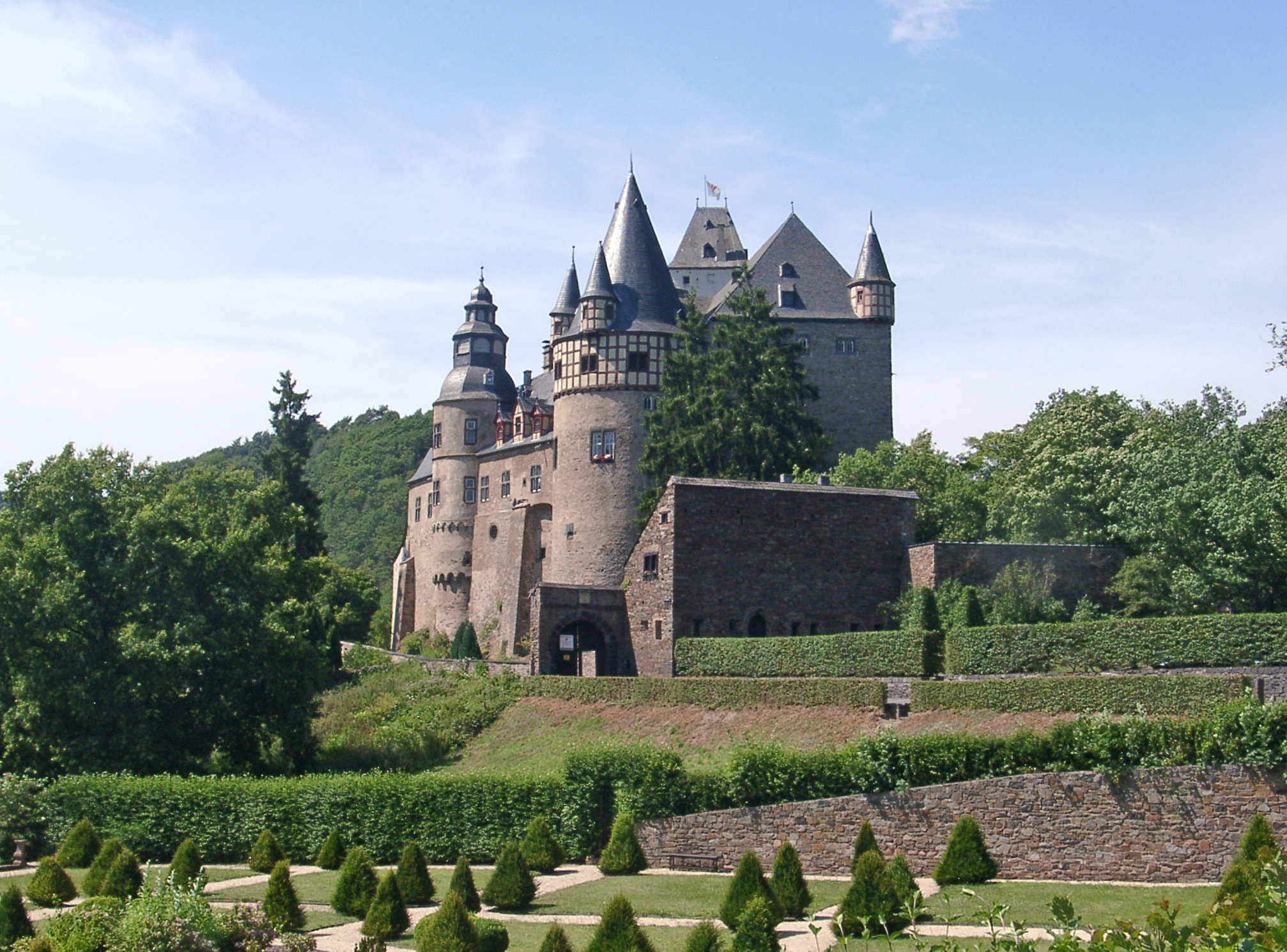
- Bürresheim Castle

- Location within Rhineland-Palatinate Location within Germany

General information
- Type: Hill castle
- Architectural style: Romanesque, Baroque
- Location: Sankt Johann, Mayen-Koblenz, D-56727 Mayen-Sankt Johann, Germany
- Coordinates: 50°21′10.5″N 7°10′46.95″E
- Elevation: 280 m (919 ft)
- Construction started: prior to 1157

Bürresheim Castle (German: Schloss Bürresheim) is a medieval castle northwest of Mayen, Rheinland-Pfalz, Germany. It is built on rock in the Eifel mountains above the Nette. Bürresheim Castle, Eltz Castle and Lissingen Castle are the only castles in the Eifel region which have never been destroyed. It was inhabited until 1921 and is now a museum operated by the General Directorate for Cultural Heritage Rhineland-Palatinate.

== Film location ==
Schloss Bürresheim has been frequently used as a film location. The castle's exteriors stood in for "Schloss Brunwald" in Austria in Indiana Jones and the Last Crusade (1989), where Indiana Jones' father (played by Sean Connery) was being held captive by the Nazis.

In the film, the image of the castle has been flipped and the building was expanded with a Matte painting depicting a copy of the right facade to the left of the main tower.

== Gallery ==
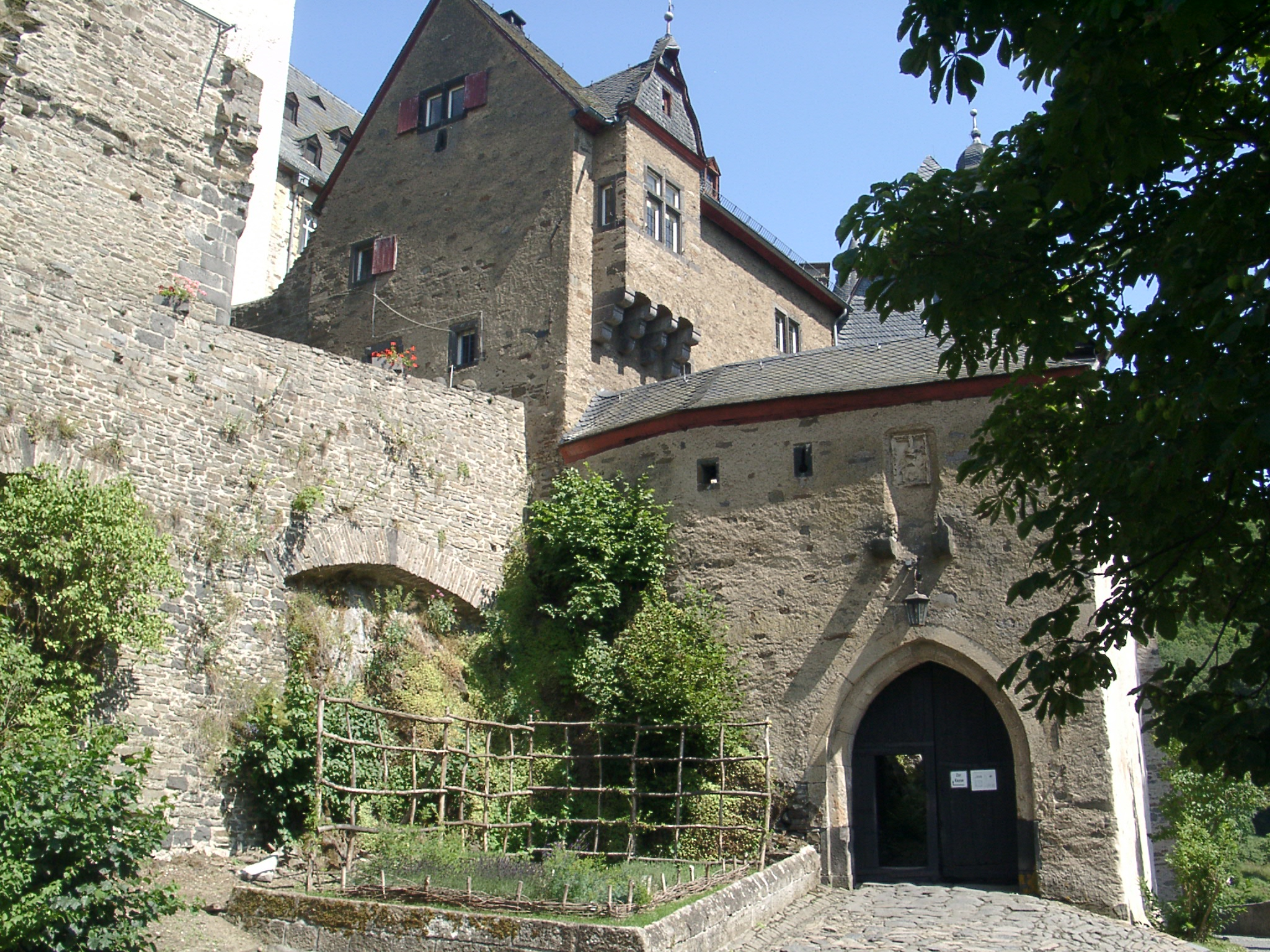

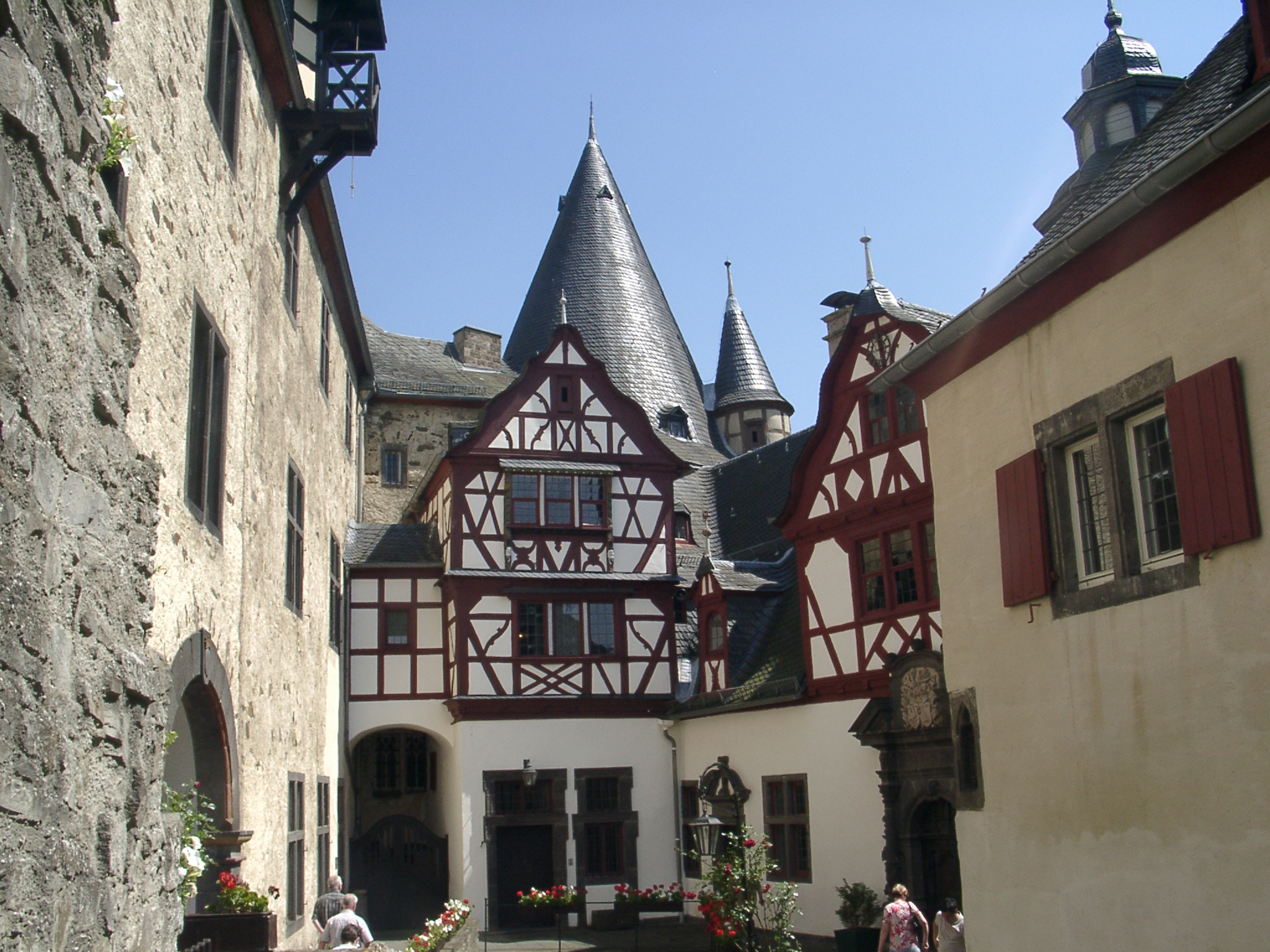

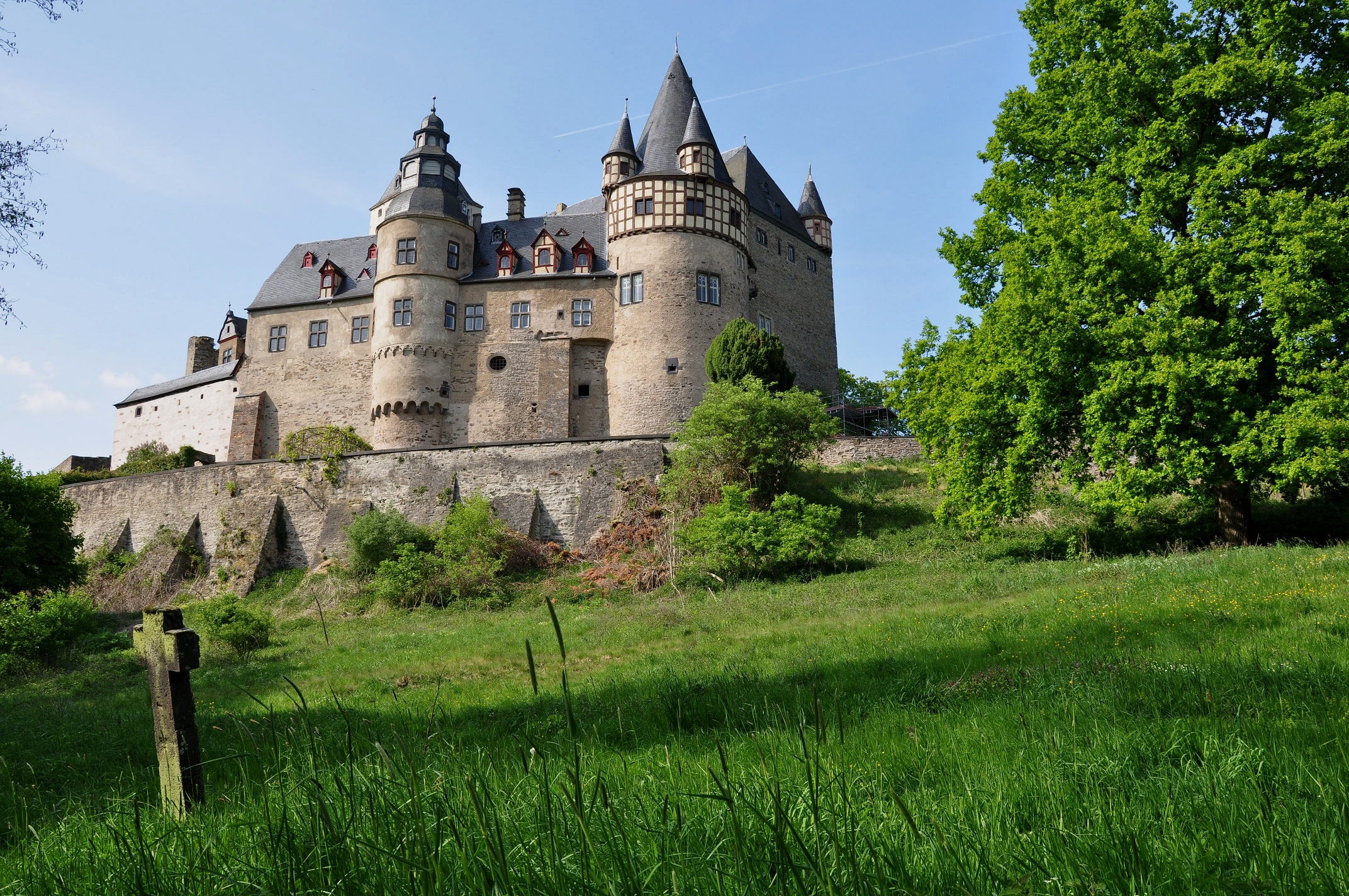

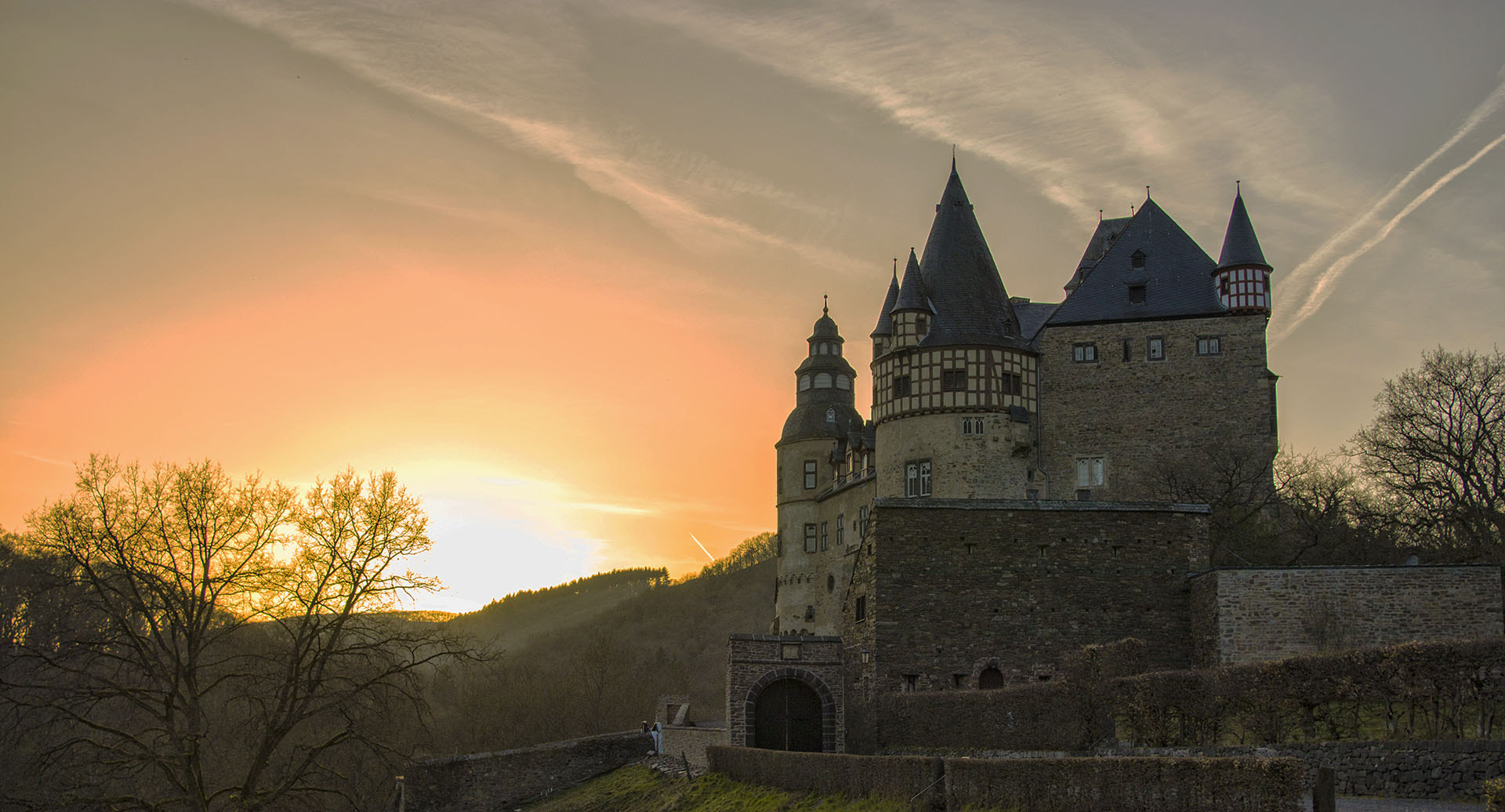
