= Mayen =

- Town
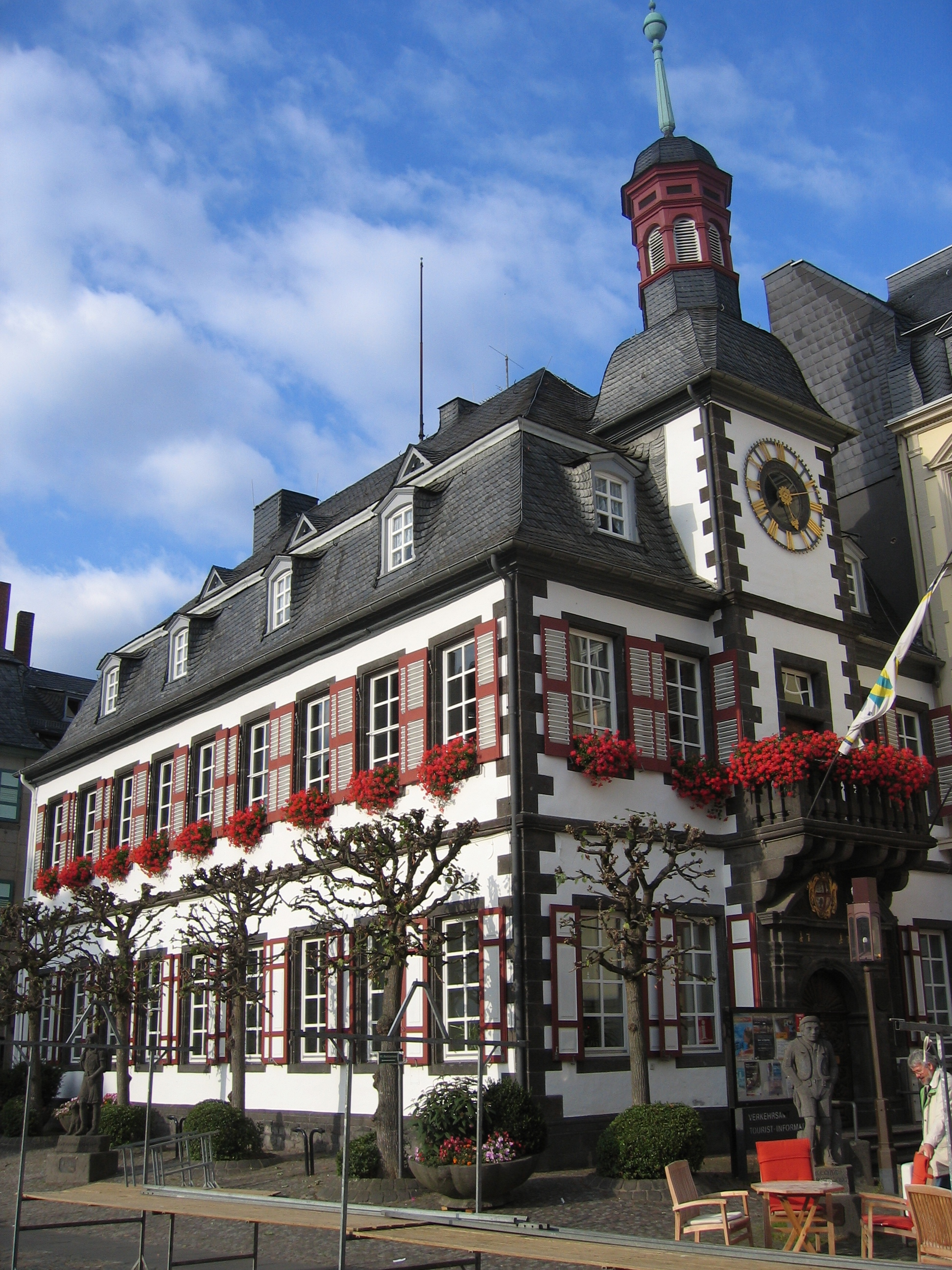
- Old city hall in September 2008

- Coat of arms

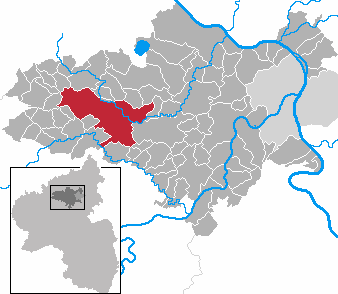
- Location of Mayen within Mayen-Koblenz district
- Interactive map of Mayen
- Location within Germany Location within Rhineland-Palatinate
- Coordinates: 50°20′N 7°13′E
- Country: Germany
- State: Rhineland-Palatinate
- District: Mayen-Koblenz

Government
  - Mayor (2020–28): Dirk Meid (SPD)

Area
  - Total: 58.19 km^{2} (22.47 sq mi)
- Elevation: 230 m (750 ft)

Population (2025-12-31)
  - Total: 19,794
  - Density: 340.2/km^{2} (881.0/sq mi)
- Time zone: UTC+01:00 (CET)
  - Summer (DST): UTC+02:00 (CEST)
- Postal codes: 56727
- Dialling codes: 02651
- Vehicle registration: MYK, MY
- Website: www.mayen.de

Mayen (German pronunciation: [ˈmaɪən]) is a town in the Mayen-Koblenz District of the Rhineland-Palatinate Federal State of Germany, in the eastern part of the Volcanic Eifel Region. As well as the main town, additional settlements include Alzheim, Kürrenberg, Hausen-Betzing, Hausen and Nitztal. Mayen is the administrative centre of the Vordereifel ‘Collective Municipality’, although it is not part of the municipality.

== Geography ==
To the west, as well as to the north and south-west of Mayen, is the country landscape of the Eifel. To the east, the landscape flattens out, running towards the Koblenz-Neuwied Basin, which is divided into the northern section of the Pellenz and the southern section of the Maifeld. This area is geographically considered to be part of the Eifel. Mayen is often called ‘The Gateway to the Eifel’.

The small river Nette runs through the town, flowing from the Eifel towards Weißenthurm on the Rhine.

== History ==
Even in Roman times, Mayen (Lat. Megina) was an important economic centre. From the end of the 3rd century up until the Middle Ages, potteries operated here, and their products were traded and sold across Central Europe. During prehistoric times, nearby quarries were the sources of basalt to make millstones and tuff used to make sarcophagi. These sarcophagi were found buried with significant glass artifacts as grave goods (both classes of items are displayed in the Genovevaburg Museum in Mayen).

The name Mayen probably comes from the name Megina. Records from as far back as 847 show this as a designation of the town; it was adapted by the Romans from the Celtic word magos, meaning field. In the 8th century the legend of Genoveva of Brabant, names Mayen as the seat of government of Duke Siegfried of the Pfalz.

Mayen received its first official recognition in 1041, and was granted Town Status in 1291 by Rudolf I von Habsburg, at the same time as Bernkastel, Welschbillig, Montabaur and Saarburg. Mayen is possibly linked to the town of Maifeld, which lies a short distant to the south-east, since Mayen was called the capital of the Meiengau in the Middle Ages.

During the Second World War, in particular during the allied forces air attacks of 12 December 1944 and 2 January 1945, approximately 90% of the town was destroyed. After the war and following a special referendum which addressed costs of rebuilding, the people voted to rebuild the town.

Up until 1973, Mayen was the District Centre of the Mayen District (with number-plate code MY). After 1973, the district administration was moved to Koblenz and the District was renamed Mayen-Koblenz District with the new number-plate code of MYK; Koblenz kept its own code of KO.

== Boroughs ==
Because of the Kommunalreform in 1970, four villages next to Mayen were incorporated. The four villages now belong officially to the town and became Boroughs of Mayen. The Boroughs are still village-like and hold most of the Agriculture of Mayen. The Boroughs are

- Alzheim (Population approx. 1300), to the south
- Hausen (Population approx. 1500), to the east, towards Koblenz
- Kürrenberg (Population approx. 1200), to the west, towards Nürburgring
- Nitztal (Population approx. 180), to the north, towards Schloss Bürresheim

The population of Alzheim and Hausen is increasing in the last years, due to the development of new residential areas.

== Infrastructure ==
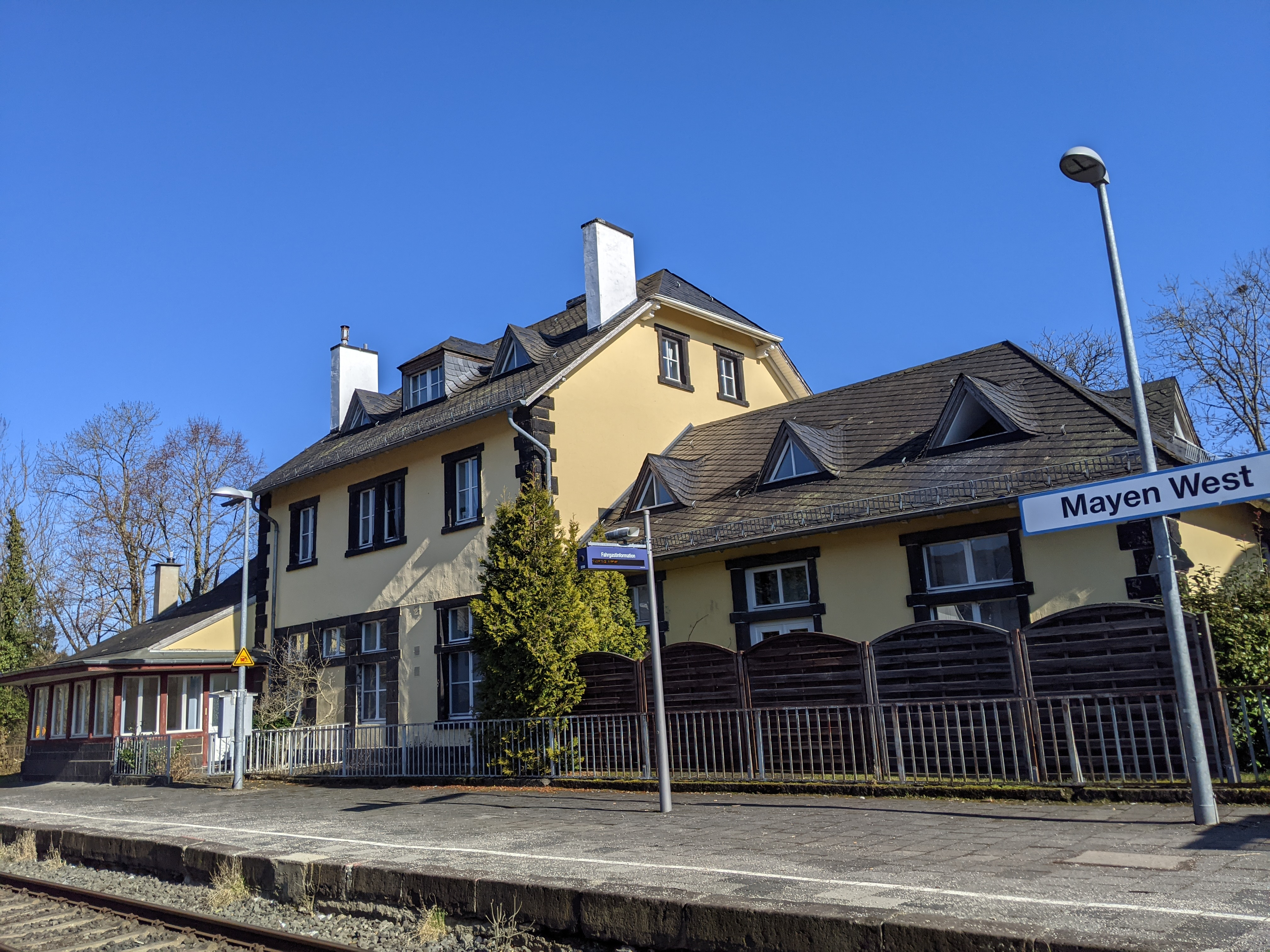
Mayen West train station

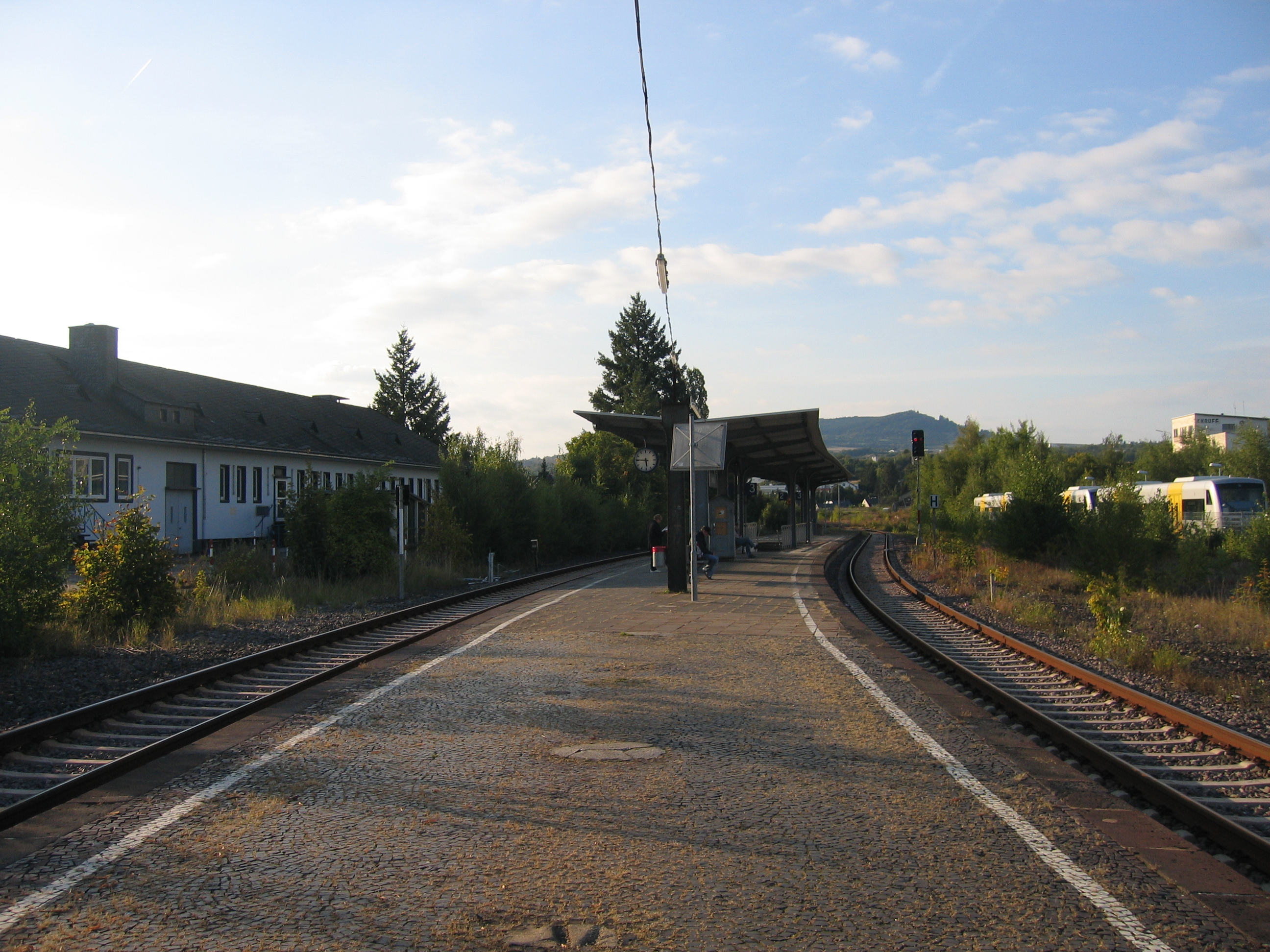
Mayen Ost train station, platform

- Favourable location between A 61 (Cologne, Ludwigshafen) and A 48 (Trier, Koblenz).
- Train connection: the Cross Eifel Railway goes from Andernach, which is on the Koblenz to Cologne route, to Kaisersesch in the Eifel, through Mayen Ost and, less frequently, through Mayen West, served by DB, section Lahn-Eifel-Bahn.
- Regular (hourly) bus routes to/from Andernach, Neuwied and Koblenz, as well as westwards into the Eifel. The town is part of the Verkehrsverbund Rhein-Mosel (VRM), (Rhine-Mosel Transport Network), fare zone number 350.
- A park and ride parking lot which is usable for public transport users is located at Mayen Ost station.
- Various shopping and business areas; several supermarkets from national chains; many clothes, sports, stationary and other shops; a cinema; various petrol stations; a large furniture store; a DIY store as well as building-supply stores. Most of these are located in a shopping area on the outskirts of the town, towards Koblenz.
- The town centre is very attractive and has a large pedestrian precinct.
- The town has its own hospital, the St Elisabeth Krankenhaus, and emergency services.

== Industry ==
Basalt mining, slate mining, cardboard industry, machine-production, aluminium- and artificial material processing.

== Sights ==
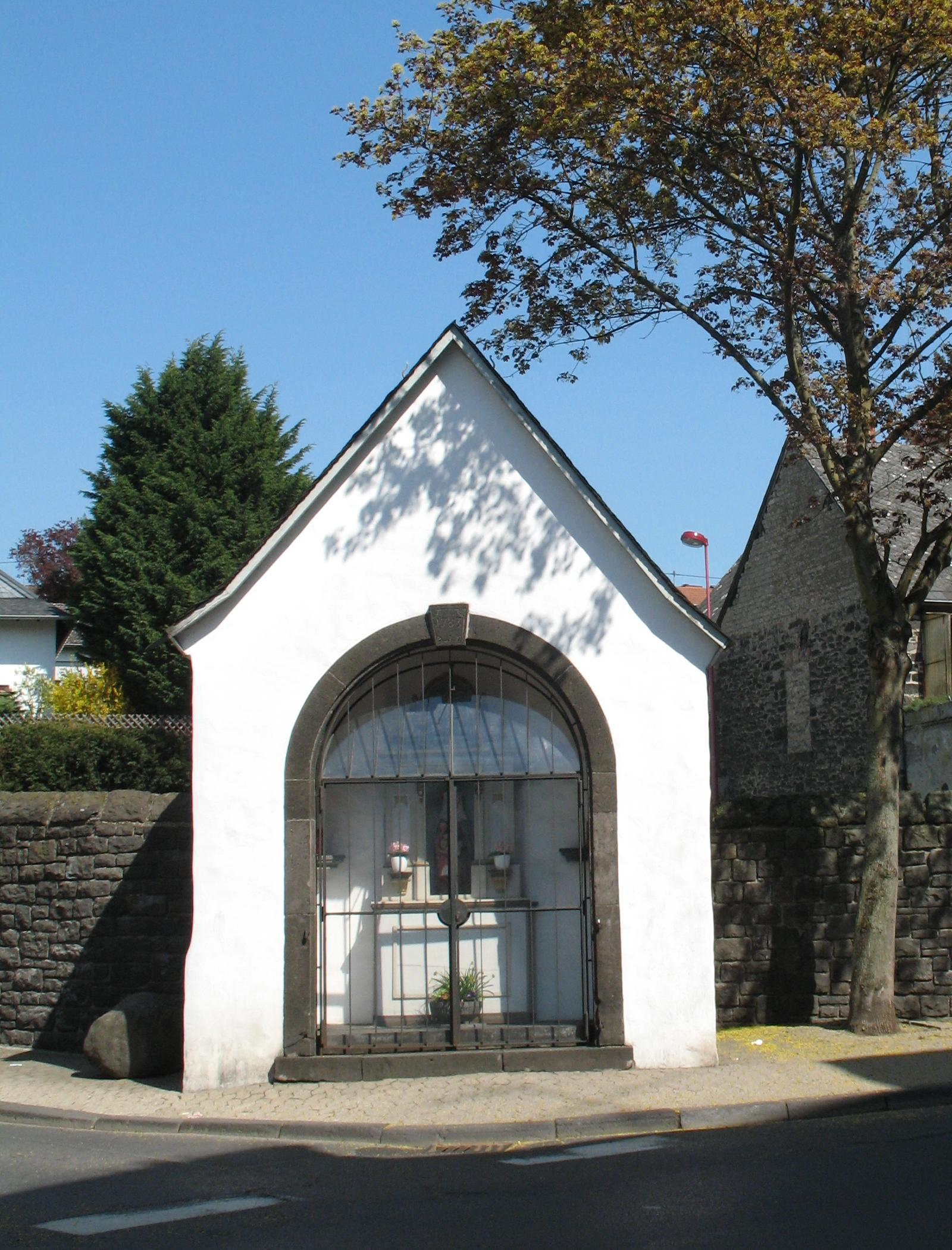
Chapel

- Genovevaburg from the 13th century, with the Eifel Museum and the Slate Mining Museum housed inside.
- St Clemens Parish Church with its twisted spire (symbol of the town, rebuilt in 1945)
- Herz-Jesu Church (built in 1911/12)
- Volcanic Information Station in the Vulkanpark (Volcanic Park).
- Nearby in the Nette Valley: Schloss Bürresheim, which was filmed as Castle Grunewald in the United States adventure film, Indiana Jones and the Last Crusade.
- Swimming and leisure pool, with one of the longest hanging water slides in the world.

== Events ==
- Lukasmarkt: yearly fair in October with rides and amusements for a week, as well as a two-day livestock market (the founding event of the fair).
- Burgfestspiele (Castle Festival Show): for several weeks in late spring, the courtyard of the castle is transformed into an open-air theatre and used for various productions.
- Stein- und Burgfest (Stone and Castle Festival); local craftsmen and guilds showcase their trade. Usually for two days towards in September.

== Education ==
Mayen is the location of

- Fachhochschule für öffentliche Verwaltung (Training College for Public Administration),
- two Gymnasien (top-level secondary schools): the Megina Gymnasium and the Wirtschaftsgymnasium (Economics Grammar School);
- a Realschule (middle-level secondary school): the Albert-Schweizer-Realschule;
- two Hauptschulen (lower-level secondary school): Hinter Burg, St Veit; a Berufschule (vocational school);
- various Grundschulen (primary schools);
- two Förderschulen (schools for children with disabilities); and
- vocational schools: one for beekeeping school, and one for stonemasonry.

The Bundeswehr (German Armed Forces) has a forces school at the Mayen Barracks, where troops are trained for psychological aspects of leadership of operations, as well as dealing with the media. This school is unique in Germany. Michigan State University, based in Michigan (USA), has a summer program in Mayen.

== Notable people ==
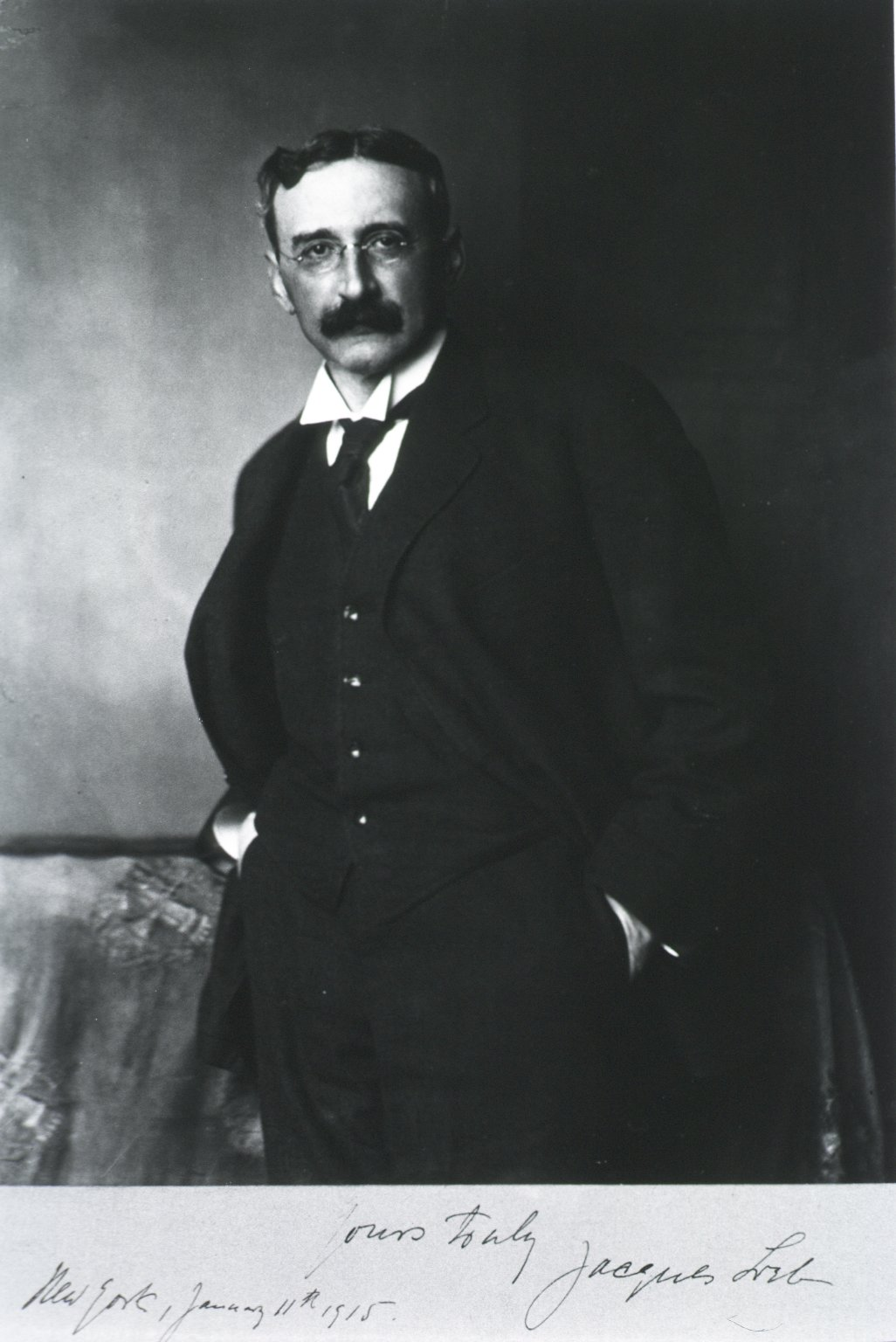
Jacques Loeb, c. 1915

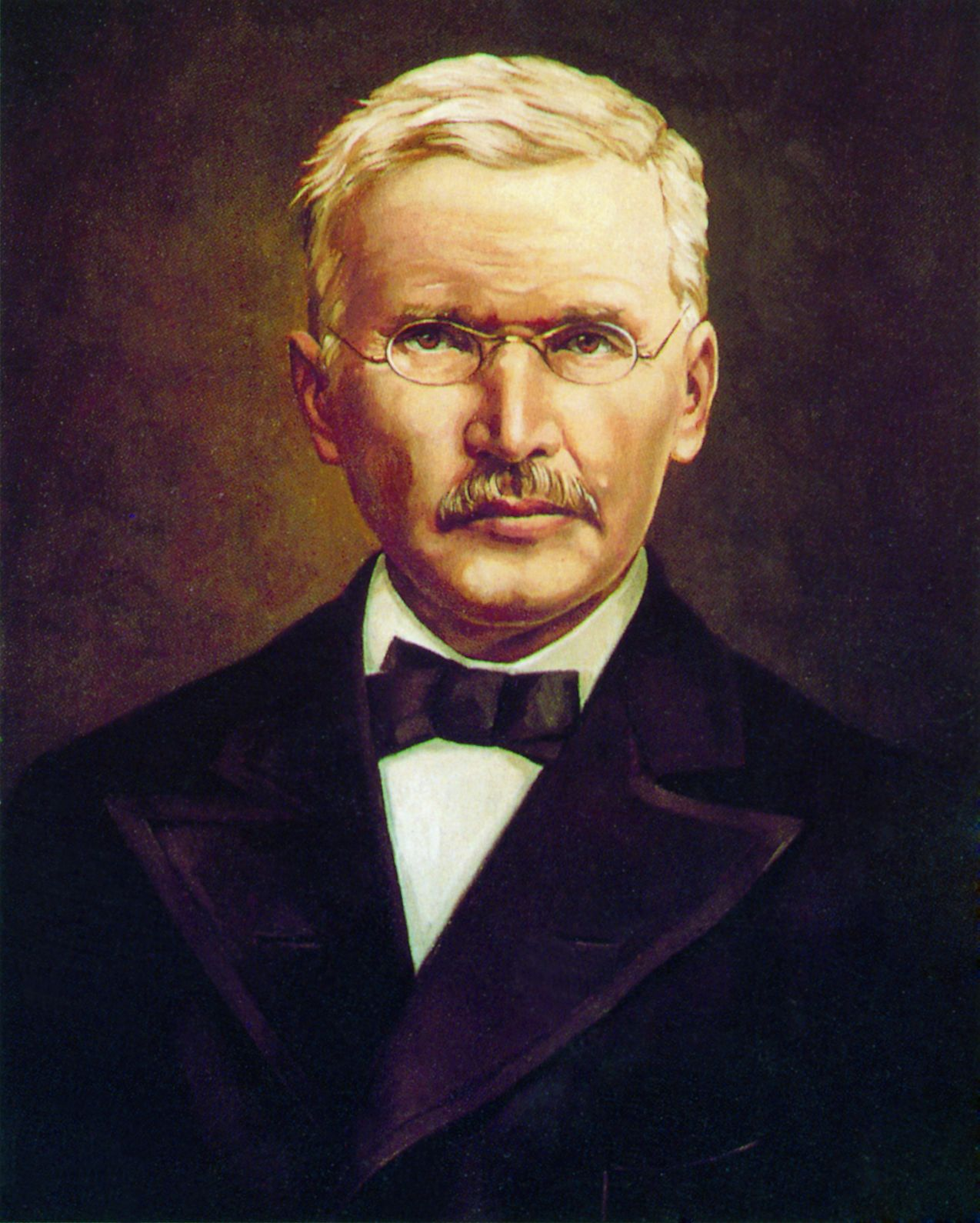
Friedrich Wilhelm Raiffeisen, c. 1870

- Heinrich Alken (1753–1827), sculptor and painter
- Balthasar Krems (1760–1813), inventor of the sewing machine
- Friedrich Wilhelm Raiffeisen (1818–1888), social reformer and founder of the cooperative movement, was District Secretary in Mayen and church hosts the Evangelical Church of Mayen
- Jacques Loeb (1859–1924), physiologist and biologist
- Fritz Seitz (1905–1949), Catholic Priest in Diocese of Speyer, longtime prisoner in Dachau concentration camp
- Werner Lamberz (1929–1978), politician
- Mario Adorf (1930–2026), actor and author
- Winfried Schäfer (born 1950), football player and coach
- Reinhard Saftig (born 1952), football player and trainer
- Rabeya Müller (1957–2024), Islamic scholar
- Stephan Ackermann (born 1963), bishop
- Dominik Meffert (born 1981), tennis player
- Marc Hennerici (born 1982), racing driver
- Jan Siewert (born 1982), football coach
- Tim Kruse (born 1983), football player

== Twin towns – sister cities ==
Mayen is twinned with:

- Godalming, England, United Kingdom
- Joigny, France
- Uherské Hradiště, Czech Republic
