= Anschau =

- Municipality
- Coat of arms

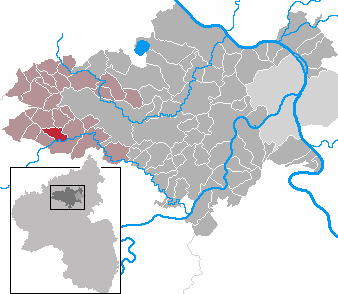
- Location of Anschau within Mayen-Koblenz district
- Interactive map of Anschau
- Location within Germany Location within Rhineland-Palatinate
- Coordinates: 50°17′53″N 7°05′47″E
- Country: Germany
- State: Rhineland-Palatinate
- District: Mayen-Koblenz
- Municipal assoc.: Vordereifel

Government
  - Mayor (2019–24): Franz-Josef Bläser

Area
  - Total: 5.15 km^{2} (1.99 sq mi)
- Elevation: 435 m (1,427 ft)

Population (2025-12-31)
  - Total: 281
  - Density: 54.6/km^{2} (141/sq mi)
- Time zone: UTC+01:00 (CET)
  - Summer (DST): UTC+02:00 (CEST)
- Postal codes: 56729
- Dialling codes: 02656
- Vehicle registration: MYK

Anschau (German pronunciation: [ˈanʃaʊ]) is a municipality in the district of Mayen-Koblenz in Rhineland-Palatinate, western Germany.
