= Münk =

- Municipality
- Coat of arms

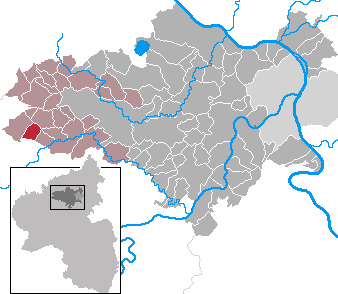
- Location of Münk within Mayen-Koblenz district
- Interactive map of Münk
- Location within Germany Location within Rhineland-Palatinate
- Coordinates: 50°18′27″N 7°2′30″E
- Country: Germany
- State: Rhineland-Palatinate
- District: Mayen-Koblenz
- Municipal assoc.: Vordereifel

Government
  - Mayor (2019–24): Alfred Steffens

Area
  - Total: 5.13 km^{2} (1.98 sq mi)
- Elevation: 480 m (1,570 ft)

Population (2025-12-31)
  - Total: 257
  - Density: 50.1/km^{2} (130/sq mi)
- Time zone: UTC+01:00 (CET)
  - Summer (DST): UTC+02:00 (CEST)
- Postal codes: 56729
- Dialling codes: 02656
- Vehicle registration: MYK
- Website: www.muenk-eifel.de

Münk (German pronunciation: [mʏŋk]) is a municipality in the district of Mayen-Koblenz in Rhineland-Palatinate, western Germany.
