= Ditscheid =

- Municipality
- Coat of arms

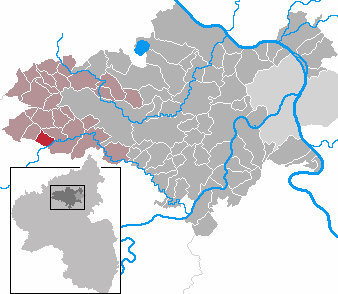
- Location of Ditscheid within Mayen-Koblenz district
- Interactive map of Ditscheid
- Location within Germany Location within Rhineland-Palatinate
- Coordinates: 50°17′44″N 7°4′10″E
- Country: Germany
- State: Rhineland-Palatinate
- District: Mayen-Koblenz
- Municipal assoc.: Vordereifel

Government
  - Mayor (2019–24): Frank Rieder

Area
  - Total: 4.48 km^{2} (1.73 sq mi)
- Elevation: 430 m (1,410 ft)

Population (2025-12-31)
  - Total: 256
  - Density: 57.1/km^{2} (148/sq mi)
- Time zone: UTC+01:00 (CET)
  - Summer (DST): UTC+02:00 (CEST)
- Postal codes: 56729
- Dialling codes: 02656
- Vehicle registration: MYK
- Website: www.ditscheid-eifel.de

Ditscheid is a municipality in the district of Mayen-Koblenz in Rhineland-Palatinate, western Germany.
