= Genovevaburg =

Coordinates: 50°19′34″N 07°13′16.59″E

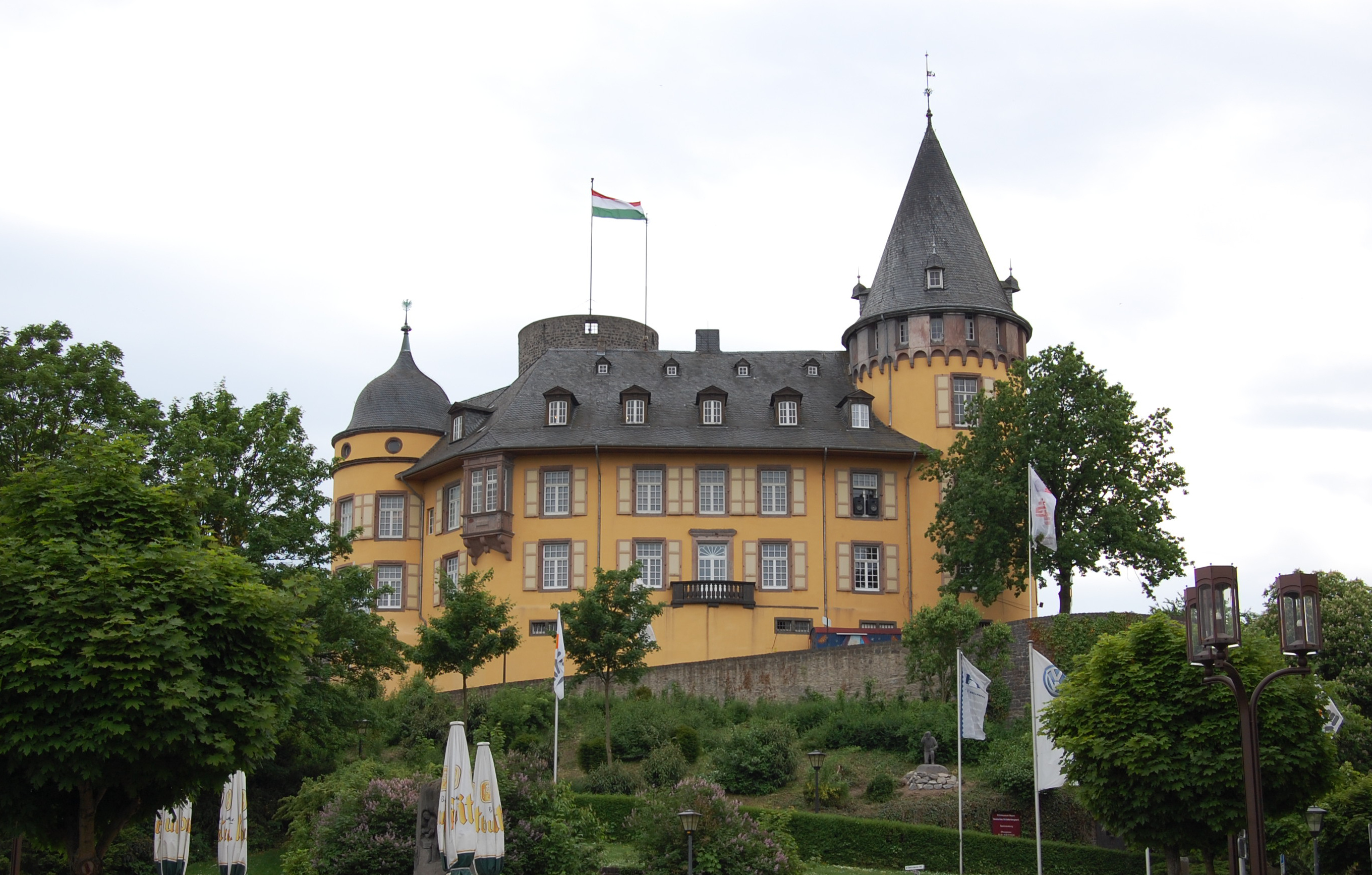
The Genovevaburg from the northeast

Genovevaburg is a castle standing on the southwestern side of Mayen in the German state of Rhineland-Palatinate. The castle is the symbol of Mayen and has been rebuilt several times since first being destroyed in 1689. Its name comes from a legend, according to which the seats of counts palatine, Siegfried and his wife, Genevieve of Brabant (German: Genoveva), were supposed to be on the same hill in (or above) Mayen. The earliest references linking the legend to this region date to the 17th century. Since when the castle and its bergfried, the so-called Golo Tower (Goloturm), have been linked to the legend is unknown.

== Literature ==
- Fridolin Hörter: Die kurfürstliche Burg und das Landschaftsmuseum in Mayen (= Rheinische Kunststätten. Heft 236). 1st edn., Gesellschaft für Buchdruck, Neuss, 1980, ISBN 3-88094-322-2.
- Matthias Kordel: Die schönsten Schlösser und Burgen in der Eifel. 1st edn., Wartberg, Gudensberg-Gleichen, 1999, ISBN 3-86134-482-3, pp. 44–45.
- Udo Liessem: Die Burg in Mayen. Eine gotische Anlage westlicher Prägung. In: Burgen und Schlösser. No. 1, 1982, ISSN 0007-6201, pp. 2–6.
- Michael Losse: Hohe Eifel und Ahrtal. 57 Burgen und Schlösser. Konrad Theiss, Stuttgart, 2003, ISBN 3-8062-1775-0, pp. 62–65.
