= Luxem =

- Municipality
- Coat of arms

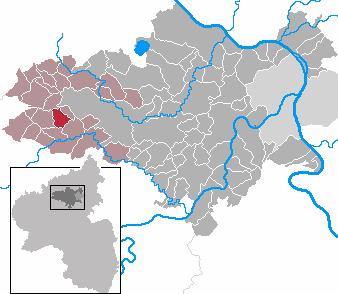
- Location of Luxem within Mayen-Koblenz district
- Interactive map of Luxem
- Location within Germany Location within Rhineland-Palatinate
- Coordinates: 50°19′10″N 7°6′24″E
- Country: Germany
- State: Rhineland-Palatinate
- District: Mayen-Koblenz
- Municipal assoc.: Vordereifel

Government
  - Mayor (2019–24): Martin Freund

Area
  - Total: 4.93 km^{2} (1.90 sq mi)
- Elevation: 440 m (1,440 ft)

Population (2025-12-31)
  - Total: 334
  - Density: 67.7/km^{2} (175/sq mi)
- Time zone: UTC+01:00 (CET)
  - Summer (DST): UTC+02:00 (CEST)
- Postal codes: 56729
- Dialling codes: 02656
- Vehicle registration: MYK

Luxem is a municipality in the district of Mayen-Koblenz in Rhineland-Palatinate, western Germany.
