= Lonnig =

- Municipality
- Coat of arms

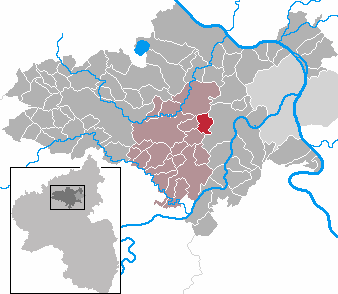
- Location of Lonnig within Mayen-Koblenz district
- Interactive map of Lonnig
- Location within Germany Location within Rhineland-Palatinate
- Coordinates: 50°18′42″N 7°24′30″E
- Country: Germany
- State: Rhineland-Palatinate
- District: Mayen-Koblenz
- Municipal assoc.: Maifeld

Government
  - Mayor (2019–24): Stefan Dörr

Area
  - Total: 5.5 km^{2} (2.1 sq mi)
- Elevation: 260 m (850 ft)

Population (2025-12-31)
  - Total: 1,232
  - Density: 220/km^{2} (580/sq mi)
- Time zone: UTC+01:00 (CET)
  - Summer (DST): UTC+02:00 (CEST)
- Postal codes: 56295
- Dialling codes: 02625
- Vehicle registration: MYK
- Website: www.lonnig.de

Lonnig (German pronunciation: [ˈlɔnɪç]) is a municipality in the district of Mayen-Koblenz in Rhineland-Palatinate, western Germany.
