= Heinrich von Virneburg =

Archbishop of Mainz

Henry III von Virneburg (c. 1295 – December 21, 1353) was Archbishop and Elector of Mainz (1328/37–1346/53).

== Life ==
Henry was a son of Count Ruprecht II of Virneburg and his wife Kunigunde of Neuenahr and a nephew of the archbishop of Cologne, Henry of Virneburg. It was his uncle's influence with Pope John XXII that determined the papal appointment for Henry as Archbishop of Mainz.

=== Archbishop ===
The Mainz cathedral chapter had elected Archbishop Balduin of Luxembourg from Trier to succeed the deceased Matthias von Buchegg, with whom Heinrich fought a bitter dispute over the archiepiscopate of Mainz until 1336. Only then was he generally accepted.

Following Pope John XXII's death, Heinrich became a supporter of Emperor Ludwig of Bavaria. This created tensions with Pope Benedict XII. In 1338 a provincial synod took place in Mainz, at which he wanted to mediate between the pope and the emperor. Heinrich wrote a declaration to the Curia on March 27, 1338, but the attempt at mediation failed. During the Thuringian Counts' War, he supported the Counts fighting against the Wettins.

On 7 April 1346, Henry, because of his partisanship with Emperor Louis IV, was deposed by Pope Clement VI. The same day, Clemens appointed Gerlach von Nassau as the new archbishop of Mainz. After the death of Emperor Ludwig the following year, Heinrich's importance declined. Nevertheless, he maintained his position in Mainz until his death in 1353, mainly thanks to the active support of his cathedral provost Kuno II von Falkenstein, in constant disputes with Gerlach von Nassau. Heinrich was buried in Mainz Cathedral.

== Sources ==
- Engel, Ute, ed. (2008). Mainz and the Middle Rhine Valley: Medieval Art, Architecture and Archaeology. Maney.
- Lee, Alexander (2018). Humanism and Empire: The Imperial Ideal in Fourteenth-Century Italy. Oxford University Press.
- Pfeil, Fritz (1910). Der Kampf Gerlachs von Nassau mit Heinrich von Virneburg um das Erzstift Mainz (in German). Darmstadt.
- Rogers, Clifford J., ed. (2010). "Germany". The Oxford Encyclopedia of Medieval Warfare and Military Technology. Vol. 2. Oxford University Press.

Heinrich von Virneburg Born: c. 1295 Died: 1353
Preceded by Matthias von Buchegg	Archbishop and Elector of Mainz; 1328-1353	Succeeded by Gerlach von Nassau
