= Virneburg =

- Municipality
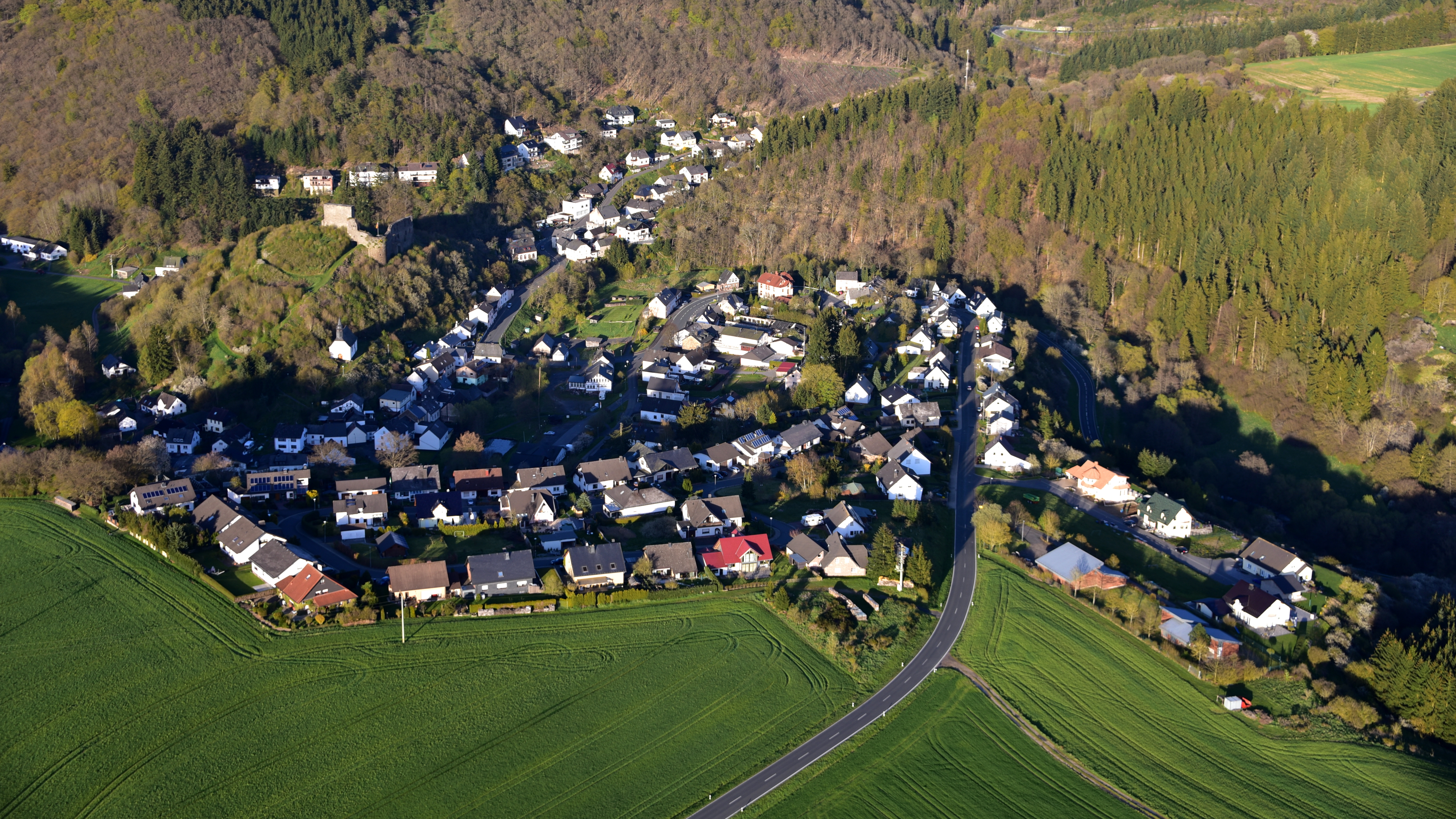
- Virneburg

- Coat of arms

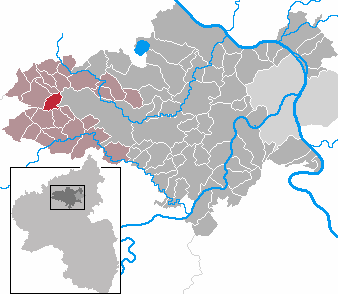
- Location of Virneburg within Mayen-Koblenz district
- Interactive map of Virneburg
- Location within Germany Location within Rhineland-Palatinate
- Coordinates: 50°20′32″N 7°4′44″E
- Country: Germany
- State: Rhineland-Palatinate
- District: Mayen-Koblenz
- Municipal assoc.: Vordereifel

Government
  - Mayor (2019–24): Torsten Zilles

Area
  - Total: 5.36 km^{2} (2.07 sq mi)
- Elevation: 402 m (1,319 ft)

Population (2025-12-31)
  - Total: 373
  - Density: 69.6/km^{2} (180/sq mi)
- Time zone: UTC+01:00 (CET)
  - Summer (DST): UTC+02:00 (CEST)
- Postal codes: 56729
- Dialling codes: 02656
- Vehicle registration: MYK
- Website: www.virneburg-eifel.de

Virneburg (German pronunciation: [ˈfɪʁnəbʊʁk]) is a municipality in the district of Mayen-Koblenz in Rhineland-Palatinate, western Germany. Virneburg Castle is located in the village.

== Geography ==
Virneburg is a municipality in the Vulkaneifel. Next towns are Mayen in the East and Adenau in the West. The average height is 402 meters above NN. Virneburg is in a valley surrounded by four mountains. In the middle of Virneburg there is a fifth mountain on which the Virneburg ruin was built.

== County of Virneburg ==
The County of Virneburg was a territory of the Holy Roman Empire between Mayen and Adenau, near the city of Koblenz. It existed between the 11th and the 18th century. It is located in what is now the region of Rheinland-Pfalz.
