= Lind, Mayen-Koblenz =

Lind
- Municipality
- Coat of arms

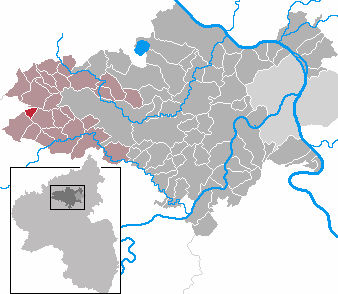
- Location of Lind within Mayen-Koblenz district
- Interactive map of Lind
- Location within Germany Location within Rhineland-Palatinate
- Coordinates: 50°19′22″N 7°02′11″E
- Country: Germany
- State: Rhineland-Palatinate
- District: Mayen-Koblenz
- Municipal assoc.: Vordereifel

Government
  - Mayor (2019–24): Wolfgang Spiering

Area
  - Total: 2.78 km^{2} (1.07 sq mi)
- Elevation: 470 m (1,540 ft)

Population (2025-12-31)
  - Total: 54
  - Density: 19/km^{2} (50/sq mi)
- Time zone: UTC+01:00 (CET)
  - Summer (DST): UTC+02:00 (CEST)
- Postal codes: 56729
- Dialling codes: 02656
- Vehicle registration: MYK
- Website: www.vordereifel.de

Lind (German pronunciation: [lɪnt]) is a municipality in the district of Mayen-Koblenz in Rhineland-Palatinate, western Germany.
