= Baar, Rhineland-Palatinate =

Baar
- Municipality
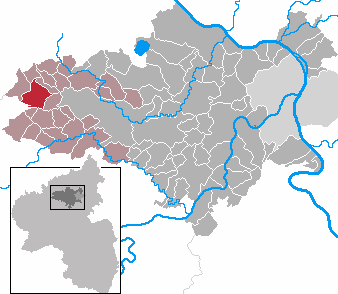
- Location of Baar within Mayen-Koblenz district
- Interactive map of Baar
- Location within Germany Location within Rhineland-Palatinate
- Coordinates: 50°20′37″N 7°2′03″E
- Country: Germany
- State: Rhineland-Palatinate
- District: Mayen-Koblenz
- Municipal assoc.: Vordereifel

Government
  - Mayor (2019–24): Heribert Hänzgen

Area
  - Total: 11.74 km^{2} (4.53 sq mi)
- Elevation: 420 m (1,380 ft)

Population (2025-12-31)
  - Total: 728
  - Density: 62.0/km^{2} (161/sq mi)
- Time zone: UTC+01:00 (CET)
  - Summer (DST): UTC+02:00 (CEST)
- Postal codes: 56729
- Dialling codes: 02656
- Vehicle registration: MYK
- Website: www.baar-eifel.de

Baar (German pronunciation: [baːɐ̯]) is a municipality in the district of Mayen-Koblenz in Rhineland-Palatinate, western Germany.
