= Urbar =

Urbar may refer to:

Places in Rhineland-Palatinate, Germany:

- Urbar, Mayen-Koblenz
- Urbar, Rhein-Hunsrück

Feudal document:

- Urbarium (German: Urbar), a medieval register of fief ownership, including the rights and benefits that the fief holder has over his serfs and peasants
