= Peter Friedhofen =

German Roman Catholic priest

Blessed Peter Friedhofen
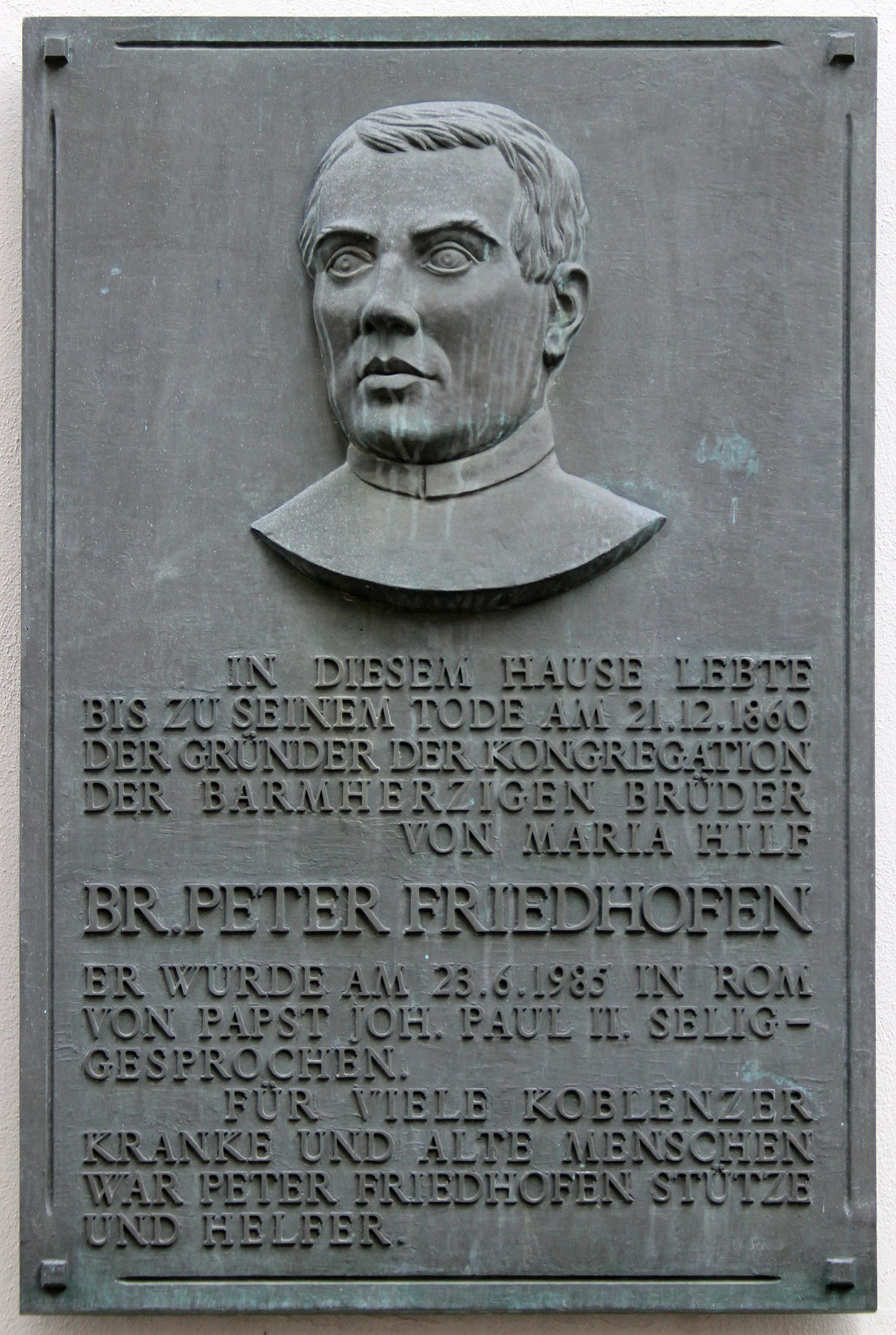
- Plaque Peter Friedhofen

Religious
- Born: 25 February 1819; Weitersburg, Koblenz, Kingdom of Bavaria
- Died: 21 December 1860 (aged 41); Koblenz, Kingdom of Bavaria
- Venerated in: Roman Catholic Church
- Beatified: 23 June 1985, Saint Peter's Square, Vatican City by Pope John Paul II
- Feast: 21 December
- Attributes: Priest's attire
- Patronage: Brothers of Mercy of Mary Help of Christians; Chimney sweeps

Peter Friedhofen (25 February 1819 – 21 December 1860) was a German Roman Catholic professed religious and the founder of the Brothers of Mercy of Mary Help of Christians. Friedhofen worked as a chimney sweep with his older brother until the latter died. This prompted Friedhofen to take care of his brother's widow and children until he founded his own religious order in mid-1850.

Pope John Paul II beatified Friedhofen in 1985.

== Life ==
Peter Friedhofen was born at the beginning of 1819 on a small farm in Weitersburg as the sixth of seven children to Peter Friedhofen and Anna Maria Klug. His father died in August 1820 and his mother died in 1828. He had five other siblings which included his older brother Jakob. The death of his parents saw the children become wards of the state because no other relatives could take care of them and so a woman took three of the children in - her poverty saw that Friedhofen could not go to school. He made his First Communion at age thirteen.

He joined his older brother Jakob as an apprentice chimney sweep when he turned fifteen and he worked in that capacity for a total of three years. When his brother died on 27 October 1845 - he was with the Redemptorists in Holland at the time - it was he who took care of his pregnant widow and her ten other children until suffering a lung condition that forced him to recuperate for a period of time. He met with the Bishop of Trier on 2 July 1847 and the bishop approved the Rule he had made for a new order. Father Antonio Liehs - the bishop's secretary - became his spiritual director. Friedhofen founded his own religious congregation on 21 June 1850 and a month later on 13 July travelled to Aachen while that November moving back to his hometown of Weitersburg. On 25 March 1851 he and two others were vested in their religious habits while Friedhofen took his vows in 1852 a year later. Diocesan approval for the order came on 28 February 1852.

He had a bad lung condition since 1843 and each winter since 1857 could no longer visit other houses of the order outside of Koblenz. But he contracted serious tuberculosis around 1853 and it rapidly progressed. Friedhofen died in the early hours of 21 December 1860 in Koblenz after six weeks of being bedridden due to tuberculosis and was buried at the main cemetery of Koblenz. His remains were transferred on 27 July 1928 to the order's motherhouse at Trier, where he was buried in the so called Maria-Hilf-Kapelle, formerly at Koblenz (where Friedhofen often went and prayed in order to get helph from the Holy Virgin) and translocated to Trier.

== Beatification ==
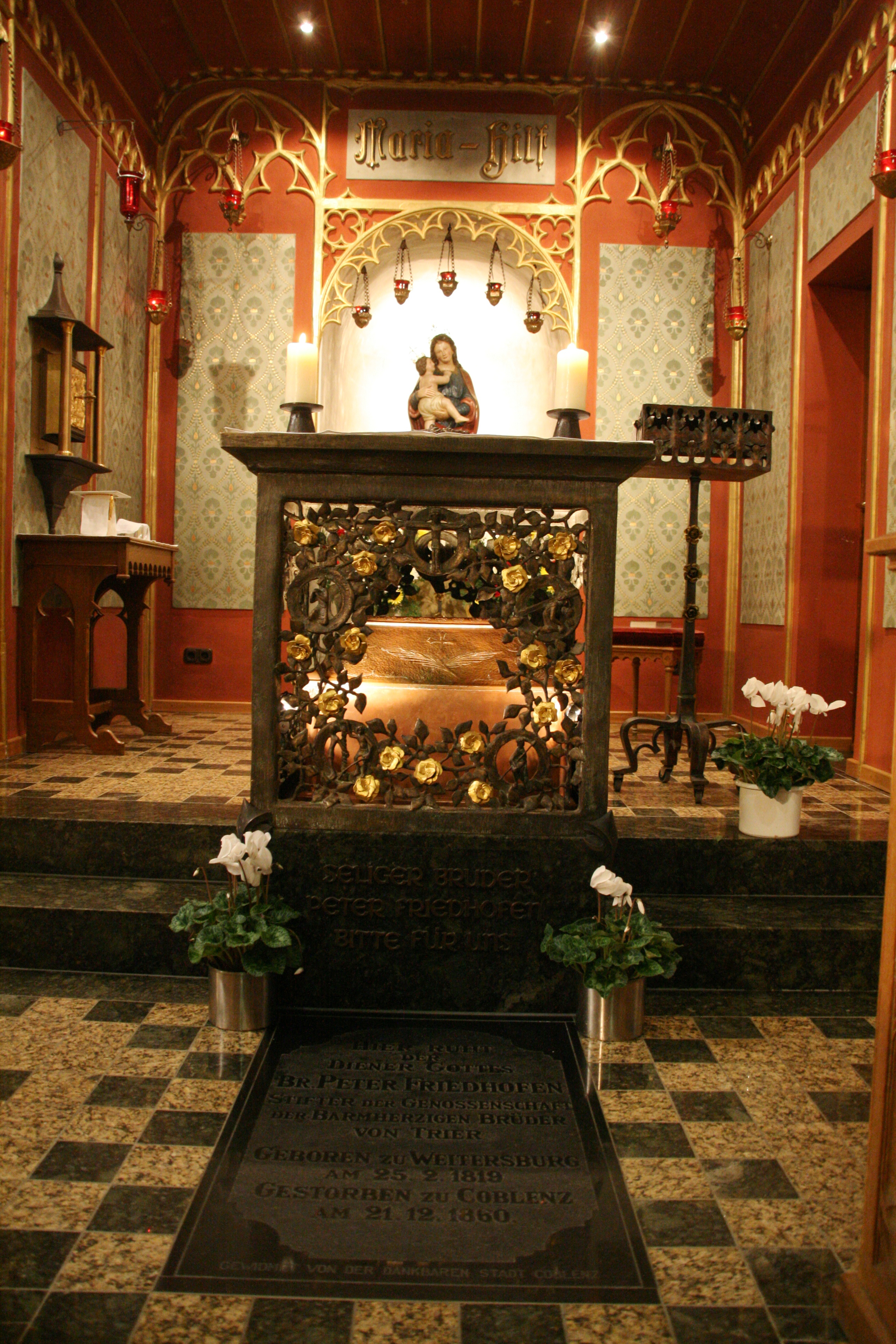
Tomb.

The beatification process opened in Trier on 26 March 1926 and concluded sometime later at an unknown point. The opening of the cause on 26 March 1926 under Pope Pius XI allowed for him to be declared as a Servant of God. Theologians approved Friedhofen's spiritual writings on 8 July 1936. Historians later approved the direction of the cause on 6 May 1981 while the postulation submitted the Positio dossier to the Congregation for the Causes of Saints in Rome in 1983.

Theologians approved the cause on 3 May 1983 as did the C.C.S. on 5 July 1983 which allowed for Pope John Paul II to declare Friedhofen as Venerable on 24 September 1983 upon the confirmation of his heroic virtue. A miracle needed for him to be beatified was investigated and then validated by the C.C.S. on 18 February 1983 which led to a medical board approving the miracle on 6 April 1984 and theologians following suit on 17 July 1984; the C.C.S. did so as well on 20 November 1984. The pope approved this on 14 December 1984 and beatified Friedhofen on 23 June 1985.
