= Gardens of Vatican City =

Park in Vatican City

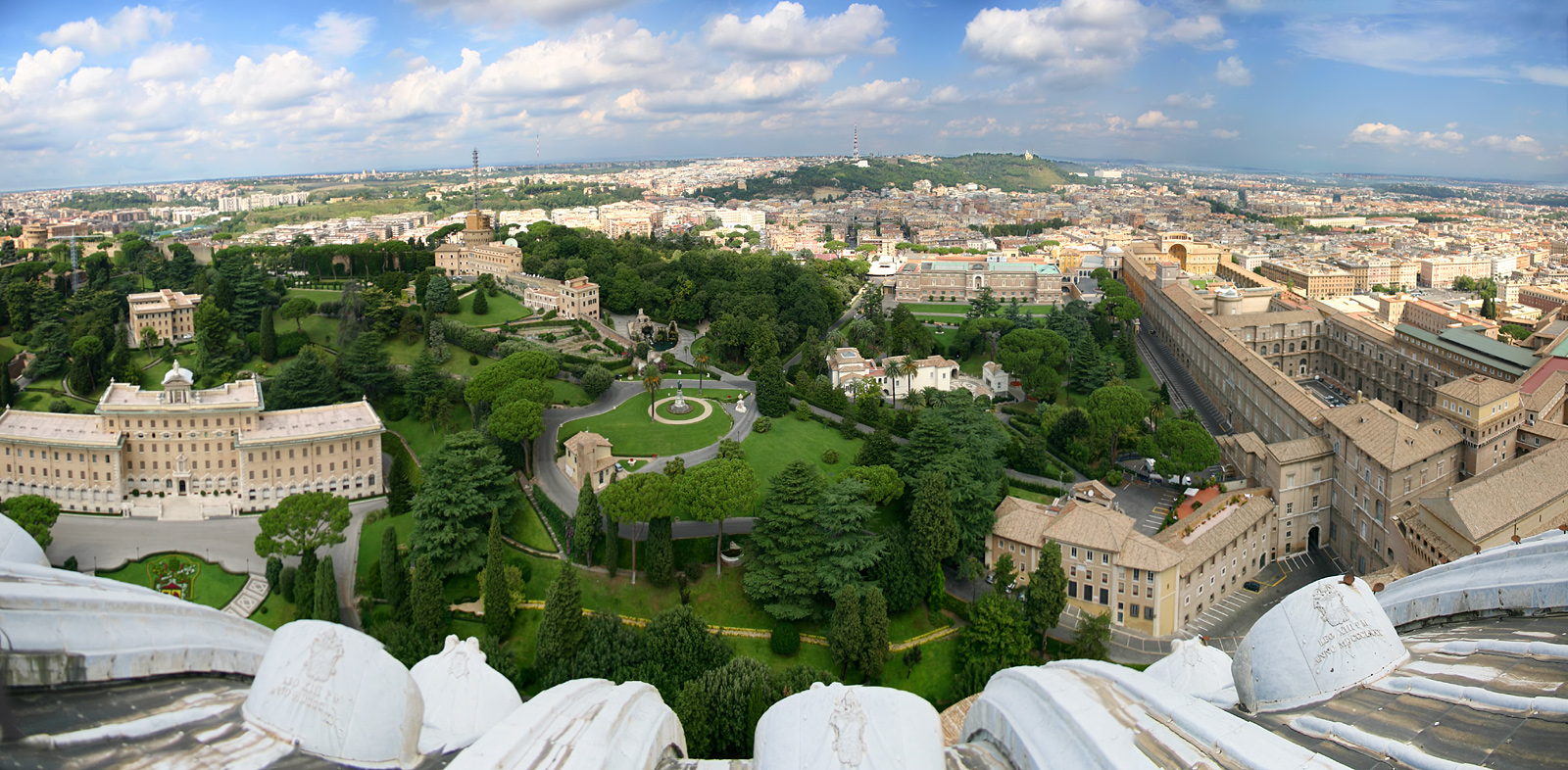
- The Vatican Gardens

- Type: Botanical
- Location: Vatican City
- Coordinates: 41°54.2′N 12°27.2′E
- Area: 23 hectares (57 acres)
- Owner: The Pope as Bishop of Rome
- Status: Active

The Gardens of Vatican City (Latin: Horti Civitatis Vaticanae), also informally known as the Vatican Gardens (Italian: Giardini Vaticani) in Vatican City, are private urban gardens and parks which cover more than half of the country, located in the west of the territory and owned by the Pope. There are some buildings, such as Vatican Radio and the Governor's Palace, within the gardens.

The gardens cover approximately 23 hectares (57 acres), about half of the city. The highest point is 60 metres (197 ft) above mean sea level. Stone walls bound the area in the North, South, and West. The gardens and parks were established during the Renaissance and Baroque era and are decorated with fountains and sculptures.

Pope Francis opened the Vatican Gardens to the public in 2014. Individuals and pre-formed groups, considered to consist of sixteen or more people, may visit the Gardens with the presence of a tour guide. The gardens also enshrine Marian images venerated worldwide at the designation of the Pope, who is the owner of the gardens.

== History ==
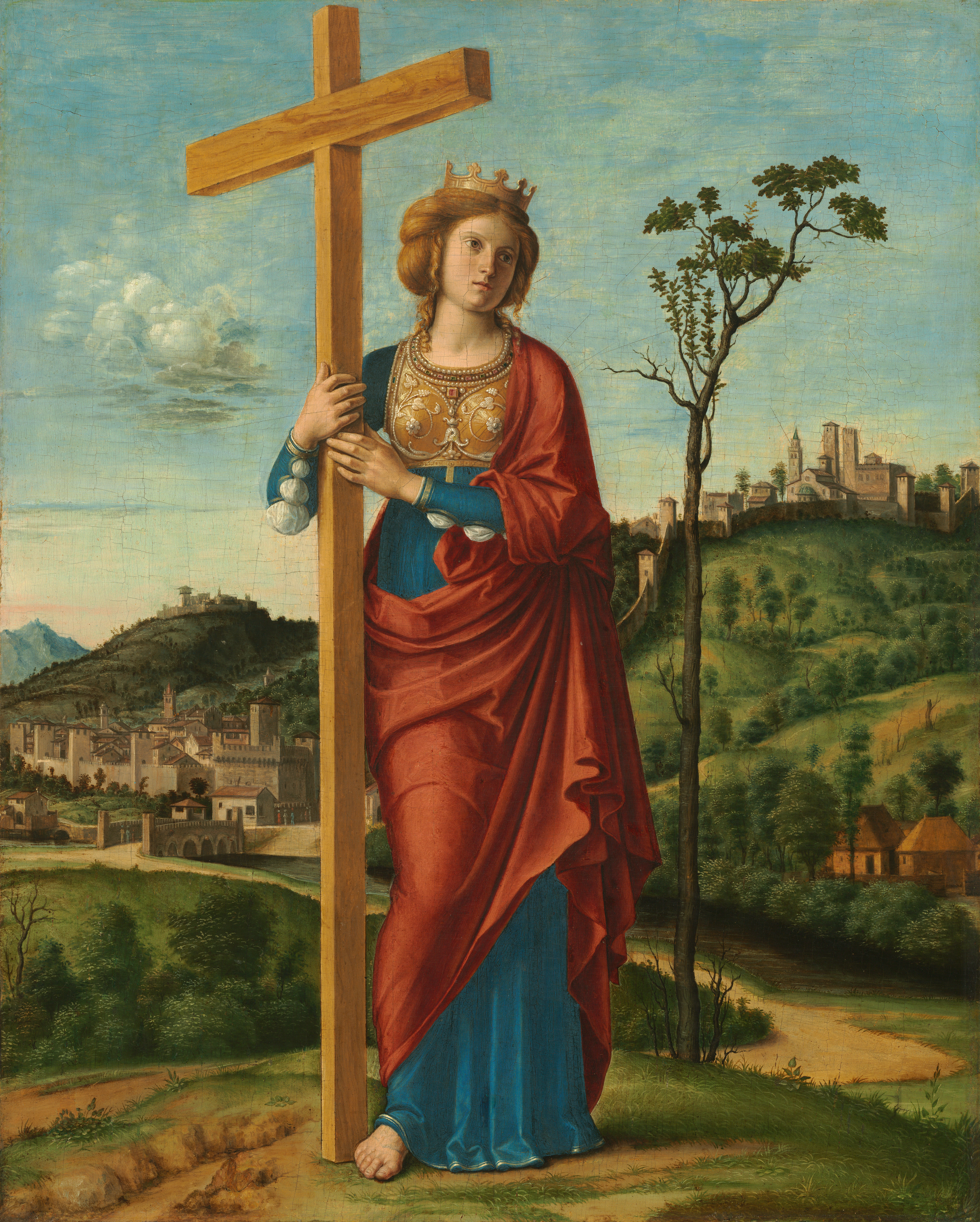
Empress Saint Helena of Constantinople carrying the One True Cross laying the grounds for the gardens using the sacred soil from Mount Calvary.

Pious tradition claim that the foundation site of the Vatican Gardens was spread with sacred soil brought from Mount Calvary by Empress Helena of Constantinople to symbolically unite the blood of Jesus Christ with that shed by thousands of early Christians, who died in the persecutions of Emperor Nero Caesar Augustus.

The gardens date back to medieval times when orchards and vineyards extended to the north of the Papal Apostolic Palace. In 1279, Pope Nicholas III (Giovanni Gaetano Orsini, 1277–1280) moved his residence back to the Vatican from the Lateran Palace and enclosed this area with walls. He planted an orchard (pomerium), a lawn (pratellum), and a garden (viridarium). Firstly, they appeared near the hills of Sant'Egidio where today the Palazzetto del Belvedere and the Courtyards of the Vatican Museums are located.

The site received a major re-landscaping at the beginning of the 16th century, during the pontificate of Pope Julius II. Donato Bramante's original design was then split into three new courtyards, the Cortili del Belvedere, the "della Biblioteca" and the "della Pigna" (or Pine Cone) in the Renaissance landscape design style. Also in Renaissance style, a great rectangular labyrinth, formal in design, set in boxwood and framed with Italian stone pines, (Pinus pinea) and cedars of Lebanon, (Cedrus libani). In place of Nicholas III's enclosure, Bramante built a great rectilinear defensive wall.

In 1921, a fire broke out inside the sanctuary of the Basilica of the Holy House and destroyed a statue of the Virgin Mary, known as Our Lady of Loreto. The statue was commissioned by Pope Pius XI in 1922. It was carved from cedars of Lebanon from the Vatican Gardens. The sculpture, designed by Enrico Quattrini and painted by Leopoldo Celani, is still one of the most venerated today in the Basilica of Loreto, in the Marche region.

Since the end of 2014, the Vatican Museums and the Directorate of Technical Services of the Governorate of Vatican City State have been running the project of restoration and conservation of various stone artifacts in the gardens. The goal of the project has been to prevent the deterioration of the objects of art-historical interest.

In October 2017 the professionals involved in the restoration conducted a study to consider, from a scientific point of view, modern methods and eco-sustainable techniques in application to the conservation of the artifacts over time. After a careful study, they opted for non-toxic and environmentally friendly products, such as oregano (Origanum vulgare) and thyme (Thymus vulgaris), along with other plant protection products used individually or combined.

Today's Vatican Gardens are spread over nearly 23 hectares (57 acres), they contain a variety of medieval fortifications, buildings and monuments from the 9th century to the present day, set among vibrant flower beds and topiary, green lawns and a 3 hectares (7 acres) patch of forest. There are a variety of fountains cooling the gardens, sculptures, an artificial grotto devoted to Our Lady of Lourdes, and an Olive tree donated by the government of Israel.

Both the Vatican and Castel Gandalfo gardens became open to the general public in 2014.

In 2019, Rafael Tornini, head of the Garden and Environment Service of the Vatican, announced the gardens had been transitioning to organic lawn management since 2017.

== Patroness ==
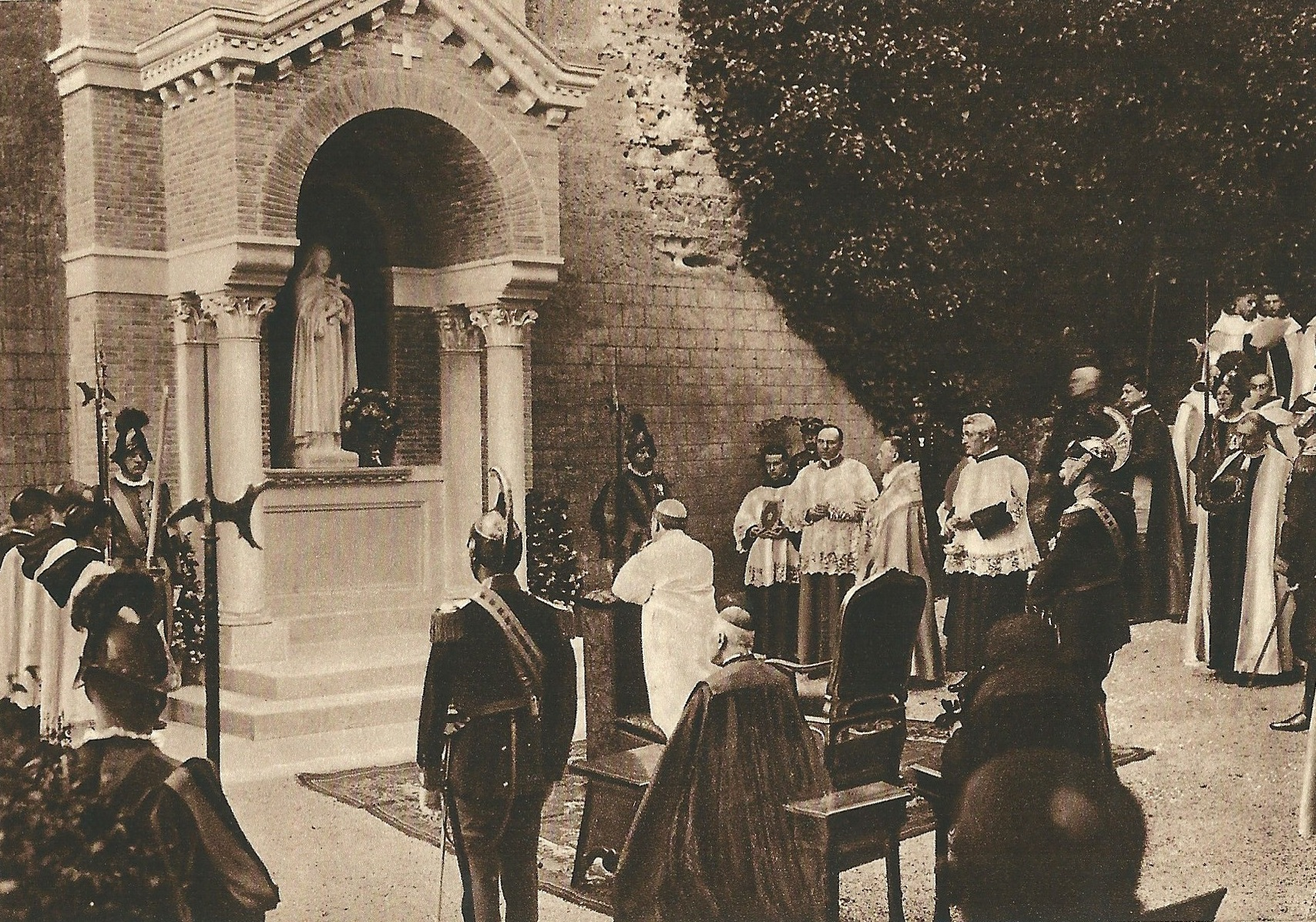
Pope Pius XI decree and conferment of Saint Therese of France to be Patroness of the gardens, flanked by Cardinal Louis Billot. The Leonine walls, 17 May 1927.

Pope Pius XI designated Saint Therese of Lisieux, France as the official Patroness of the gardens on 17 May 1927, according to her the title as "Sacred Keeper of the Gardens" and within the same year, a small chapel dedicated to her was built within the gardens near the Leonine walls.

== List of Marian images enshrined ==
The following are venerated images of the Blessed Virgin Mary, whom are expressedly designated via Pontifical decree to be enshrined at the Vatican Gardens:

Marian images permanently enshrined in the Gardens of Vatican City
Image within the Gardens	Place of Devotion	Nation	Year of Devotion	Date of Installation	Feast Day
Our Lady of the Immaculate Conception	Lourdes, France	(France)	1858	1 June 1902	February 11
Our Lady of the Watch	Monte Figogna	(Italy)	1490	2 May 1917	August 29
Our Lady of Guadalupe	Tepeyac, Mexico	(Mexico)	1531	14 October 1939	December 12
Our Lady of Fátima	Fátima, Portugal	(Portugal)	1917	29 May 1983	13 May
The Madonna of Schoenstatt	Vallendar, Germany	(Germany)	1914	1992	October 18
The Black Madonna of Częstochowa	Jasna Góra, Poland	(Poland)	1382	1994	August 26
The Virgin of Mercy	Savona	(Italy)	1536	10 May 1995	March 18
Our Lady of Divine Love	Via Ardeatina	(Italy)	1740	10 May 1999	Monday of Pentecost
Our Lady of Sacred Heart of Taggia	Rome	(Italy)	1855	21 March 2006	March 11
Our Lady of Good Counsel	Genazzano, Italy	(Italy)	1467	11 July 2009	April 26
Virgin of Suyapa	Honduras	(Honduras)	1747	20 September 2013	February 3
Nuestra Senora de La Antigua	Panama	(Panama)	1513	26 October 2013	September 9
Our Lady of Charity	Cuba	(Cuba)	1612	28 August 2014	September 8
Our Lady of Penafrancia	Philippines	(Philippines)	1434	3 December 2015	3rd Saturday in September
Our Lady of Aparecida	Brazil	(Brazil)	1717	3 September 2016	October 12
Virgen de Copacabana	Bolivia	(Bolivia)	1583	25 September 2017	February 2 August 5
Virgin of Presentation of El Quinche	Ecuador	(Ecuador)	1580	17 May 2019	February 2
Our Lady of the Rosary of Chiquinquirá	Colombia	(Colombia)	1560	9 July 2021	February 2
Our Lady of the Pillar	Spain	(Colombia)	40 A.D.	25 September 2025	October 12
Our Lady of Sorrows of Sastin	Slovakia	(Colombia)	1733	6 December 2025	September 15

== Gallery ==
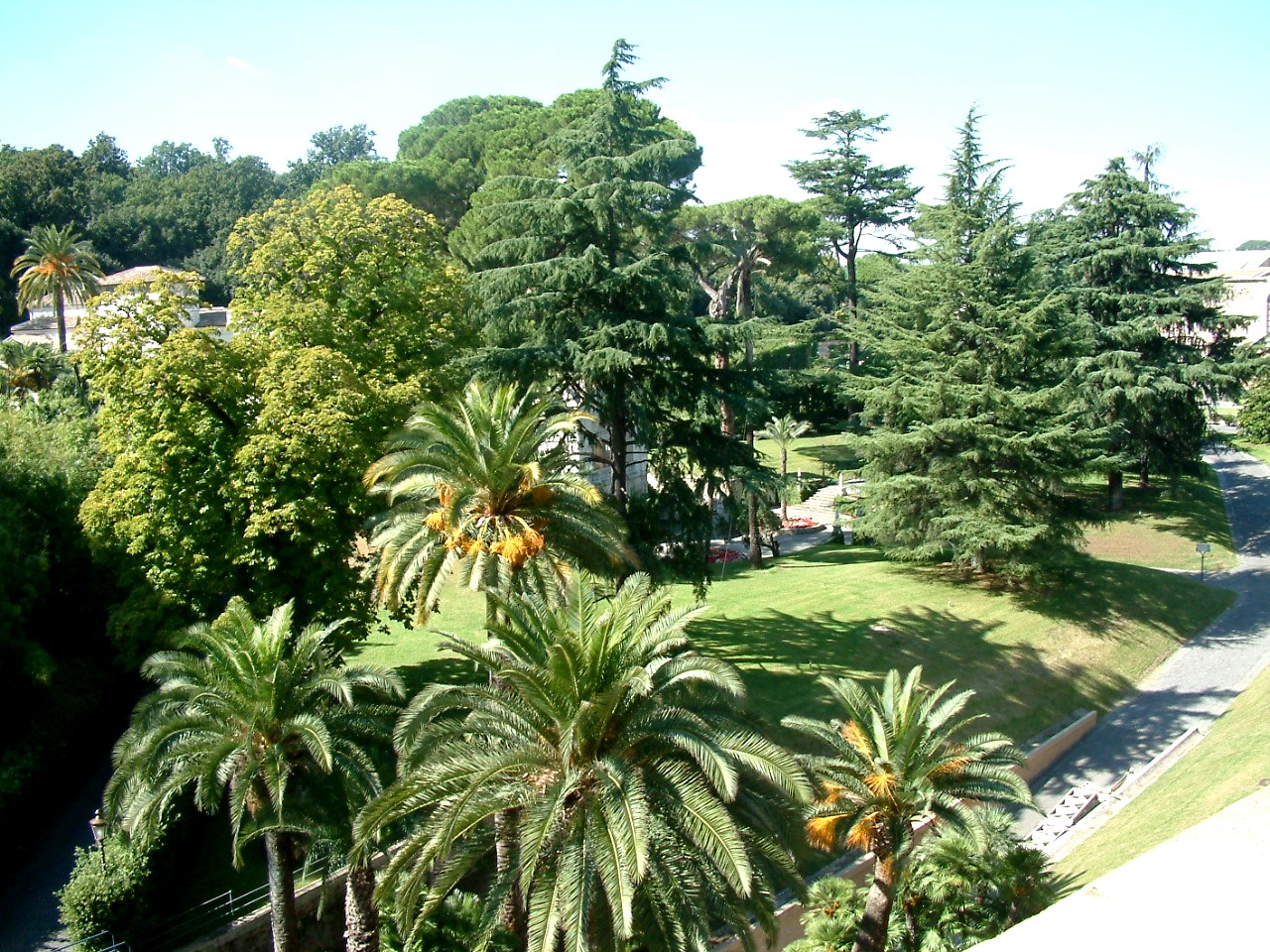
Part of the Vatican Gardens

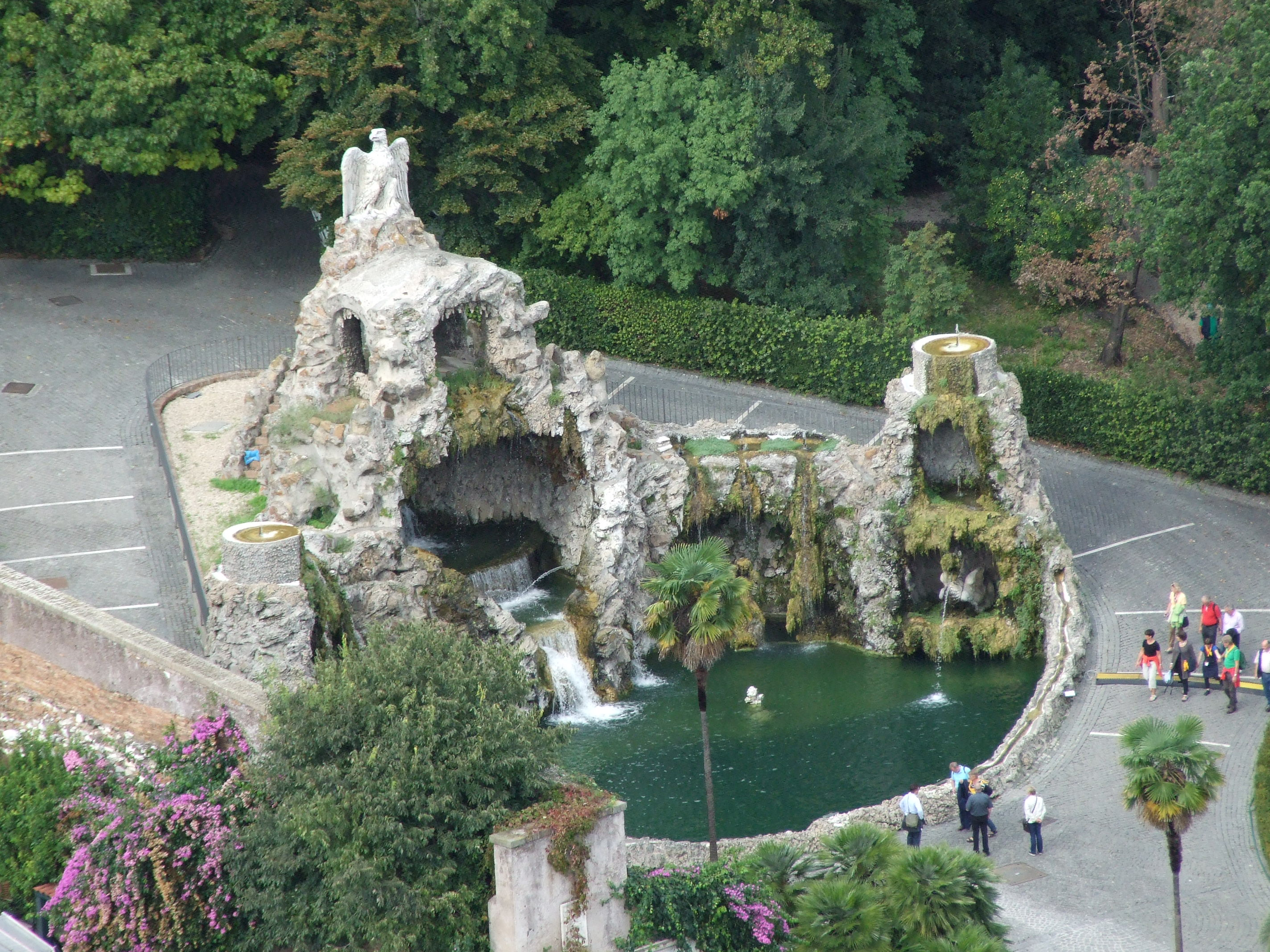
The Fountain of the Eagle "Fontana dell'Aquilone" in the Vatican Gardens

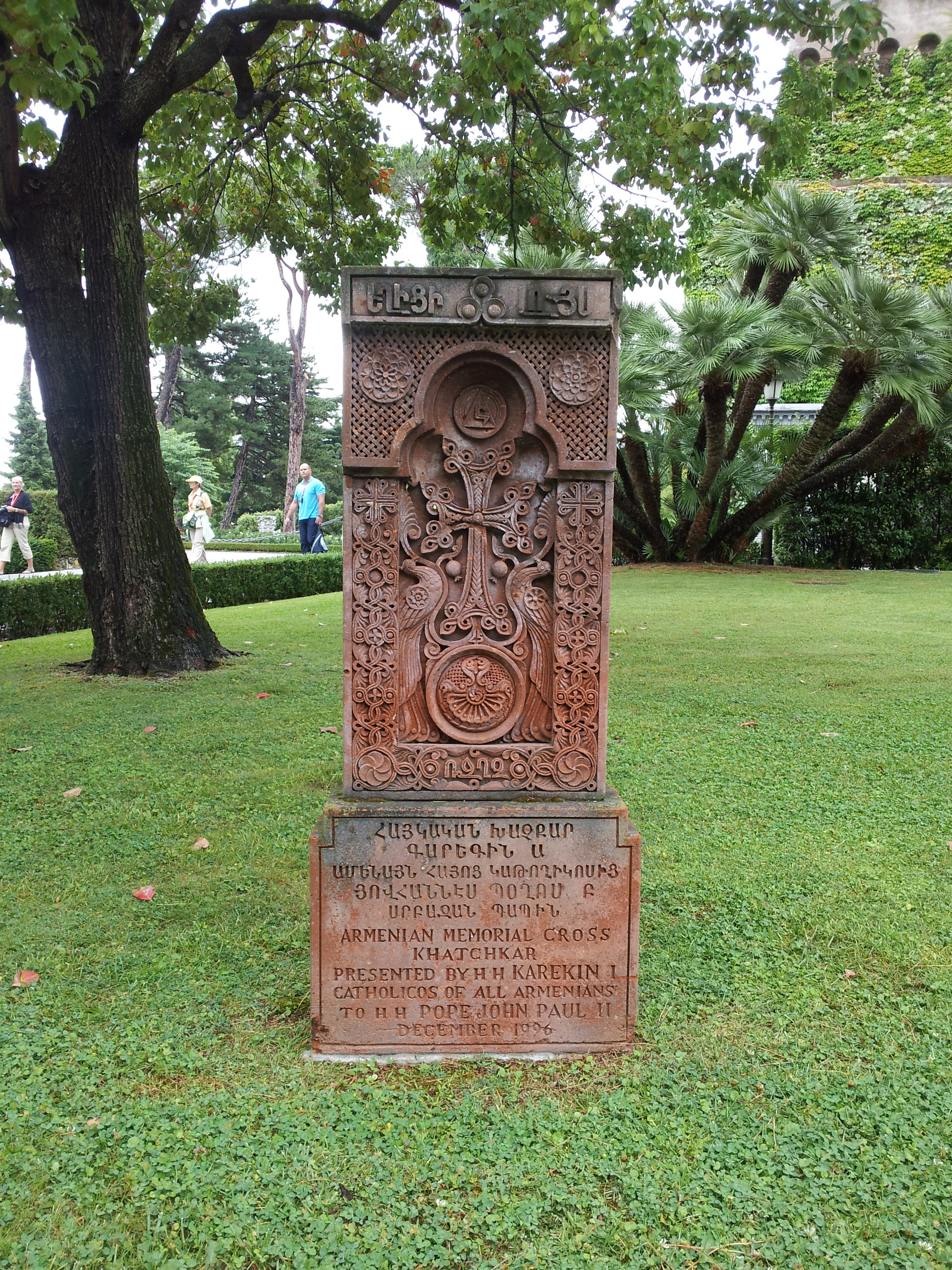
Armenian cross monument (Khatchkar) inside the Vatican Gardens

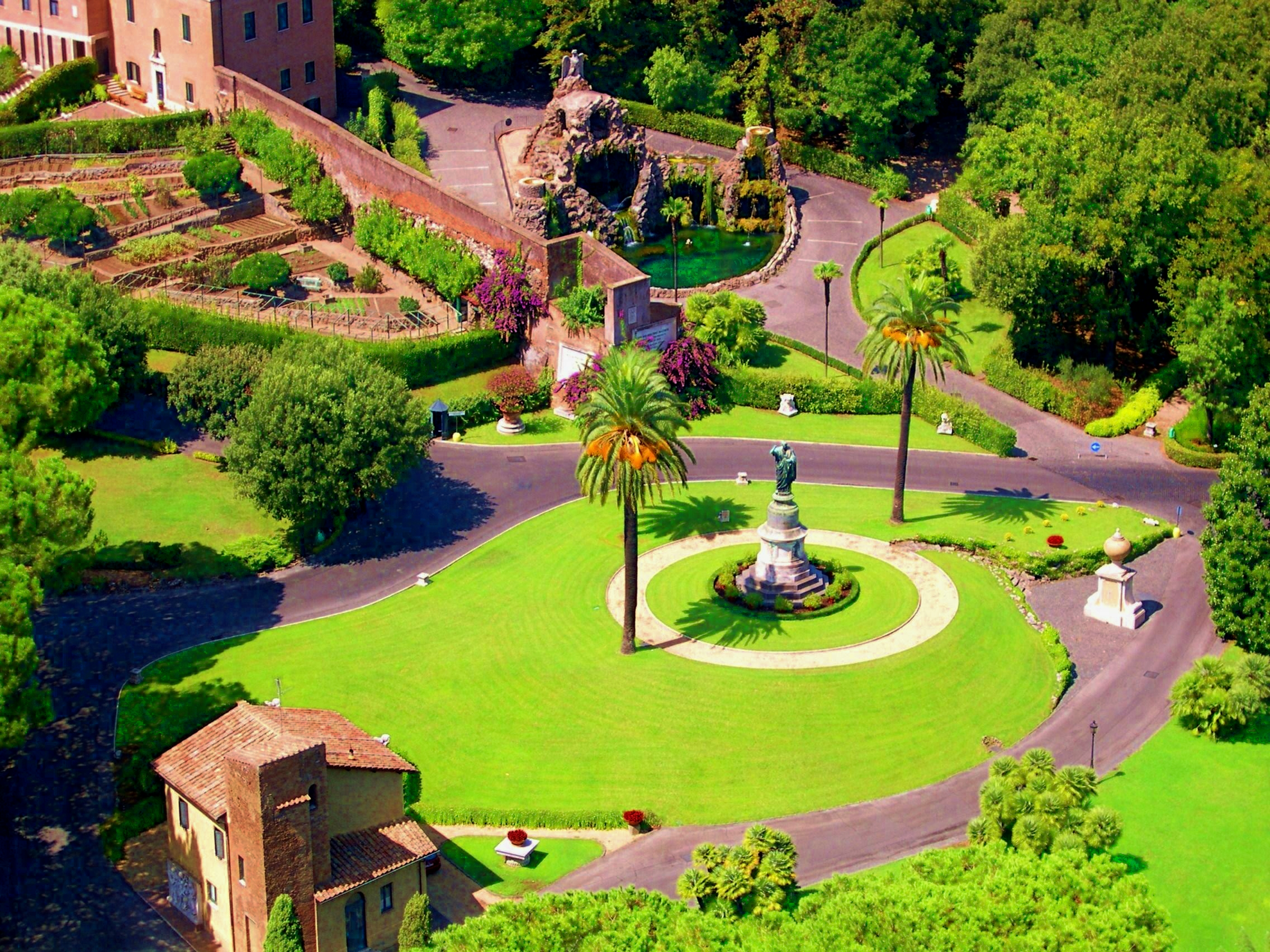
Vatican Gardens

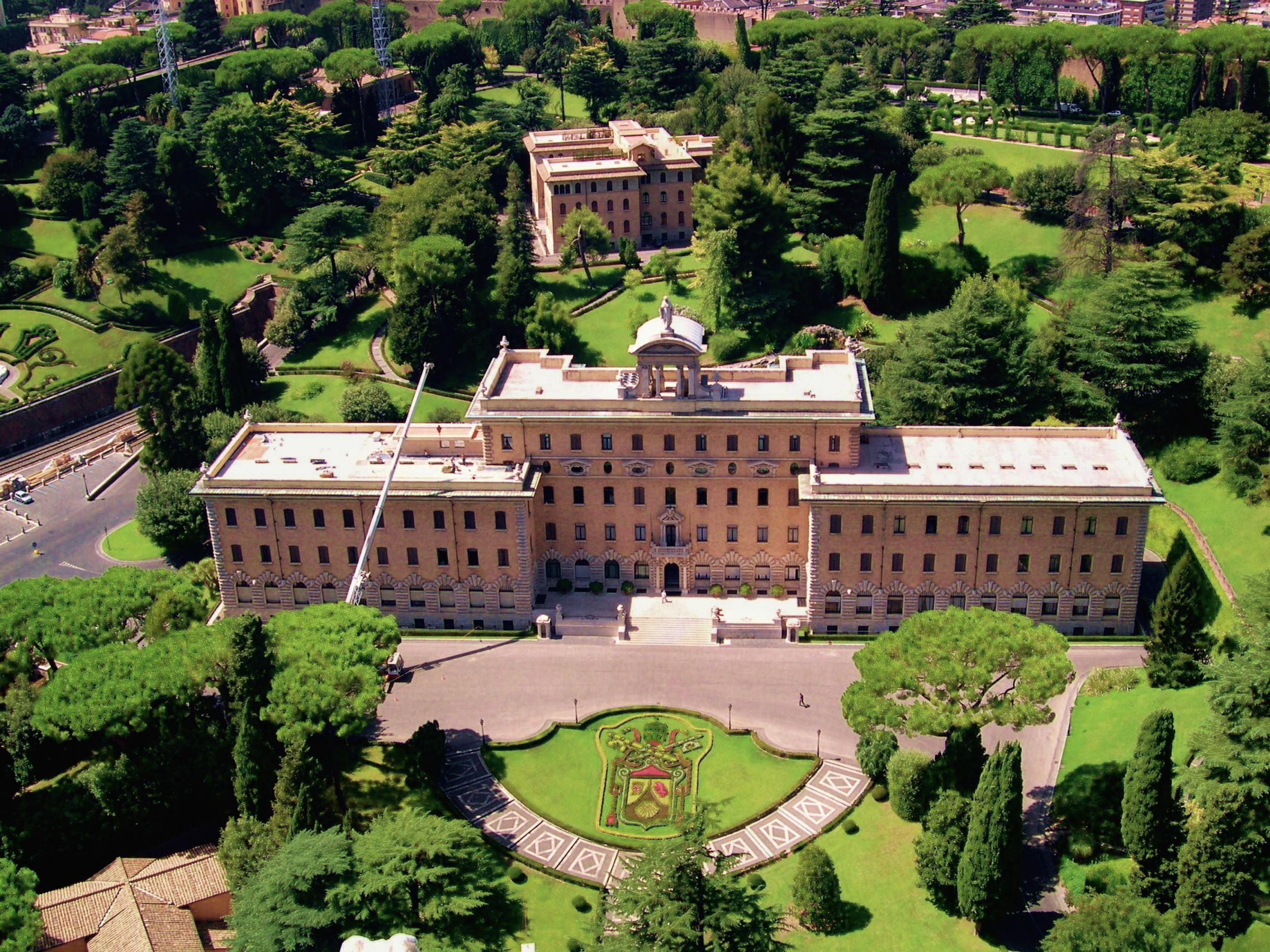
Palace of the Governorate of Vatican City State

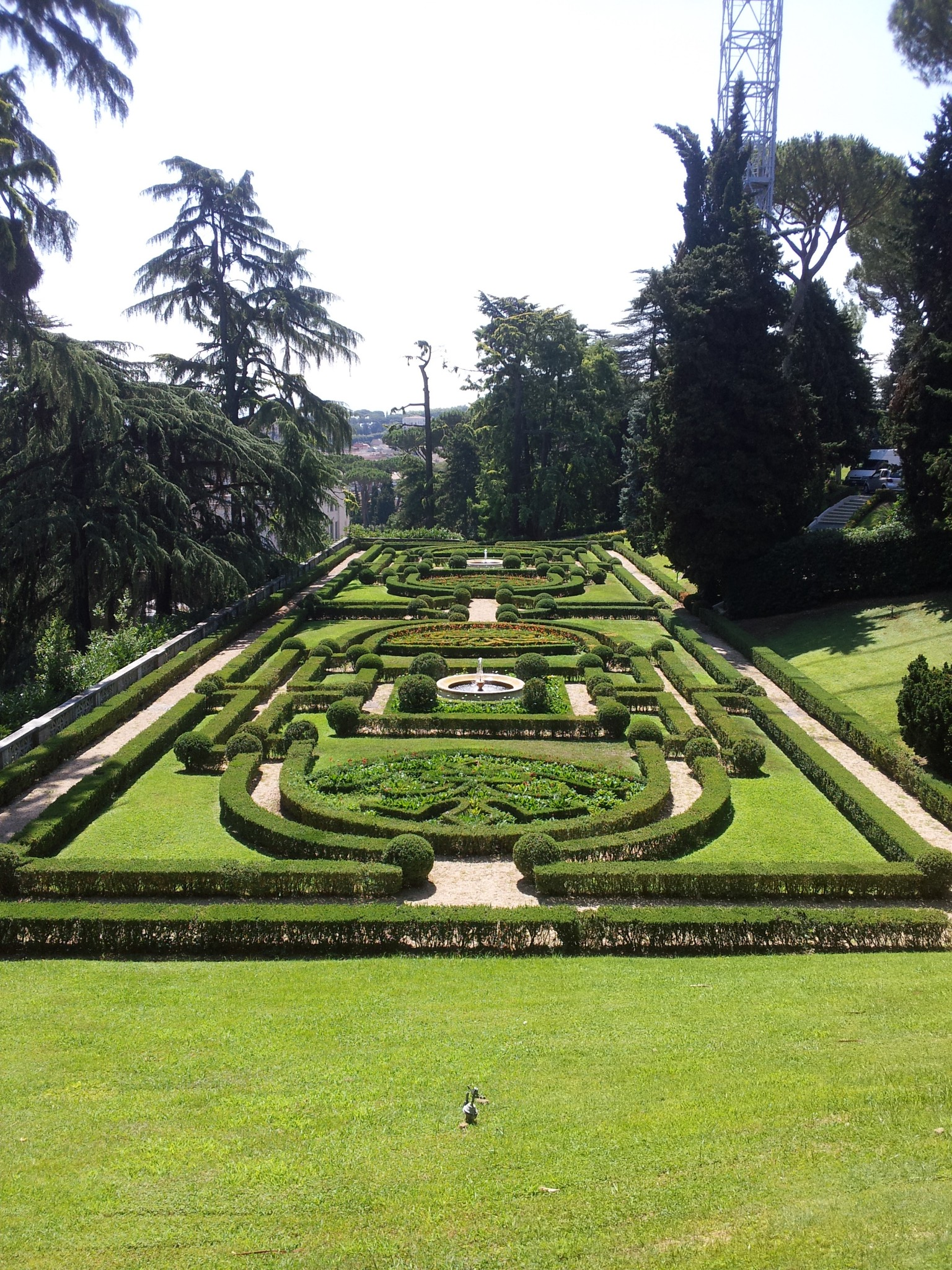
Italian Garden

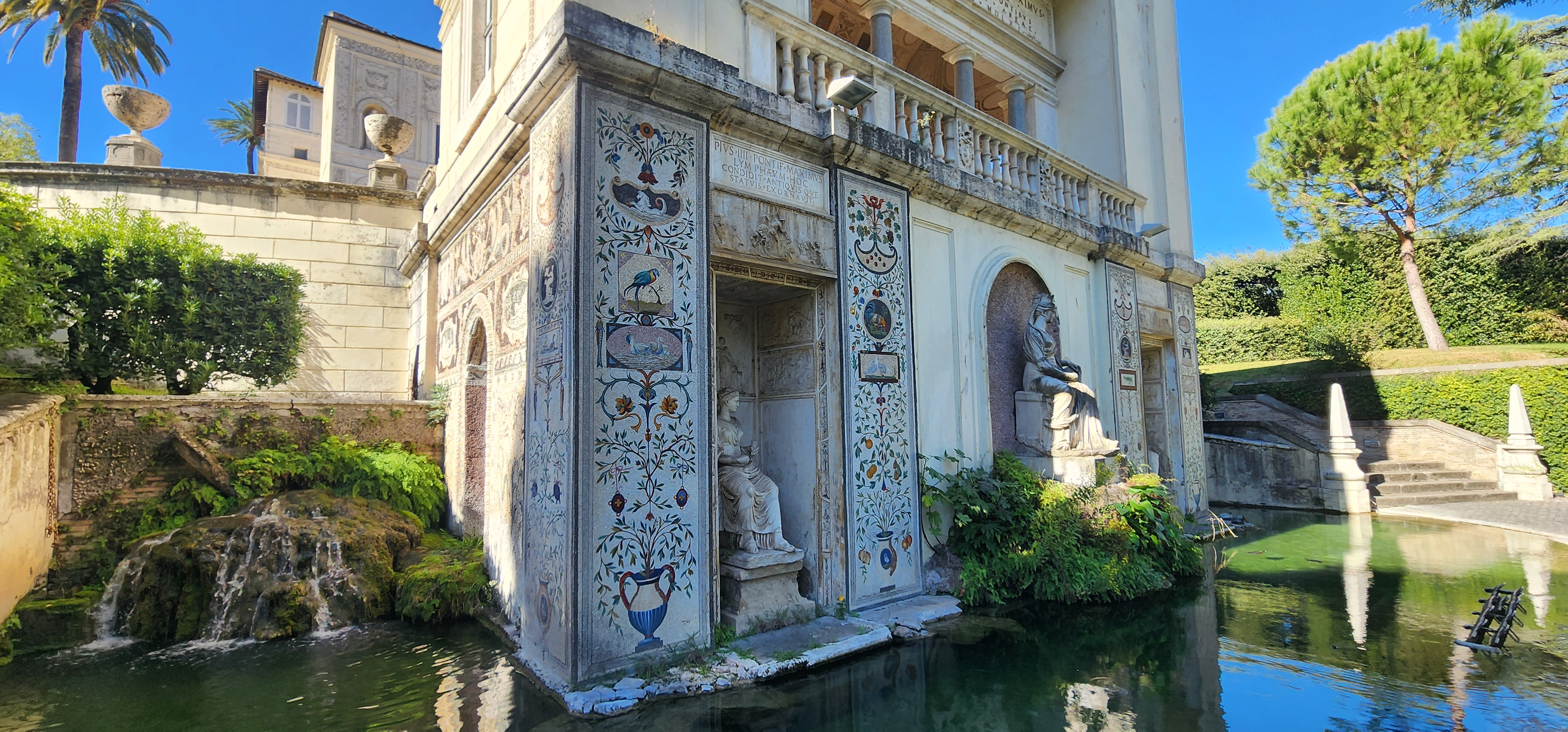
The Loggia of the Casino of Pius IV, a Renaissance building located in the Vatican Gardens. The Casino of Pius IV was built in the mid-16th century by architect Pirro Ligorio for Pope Pius IV.

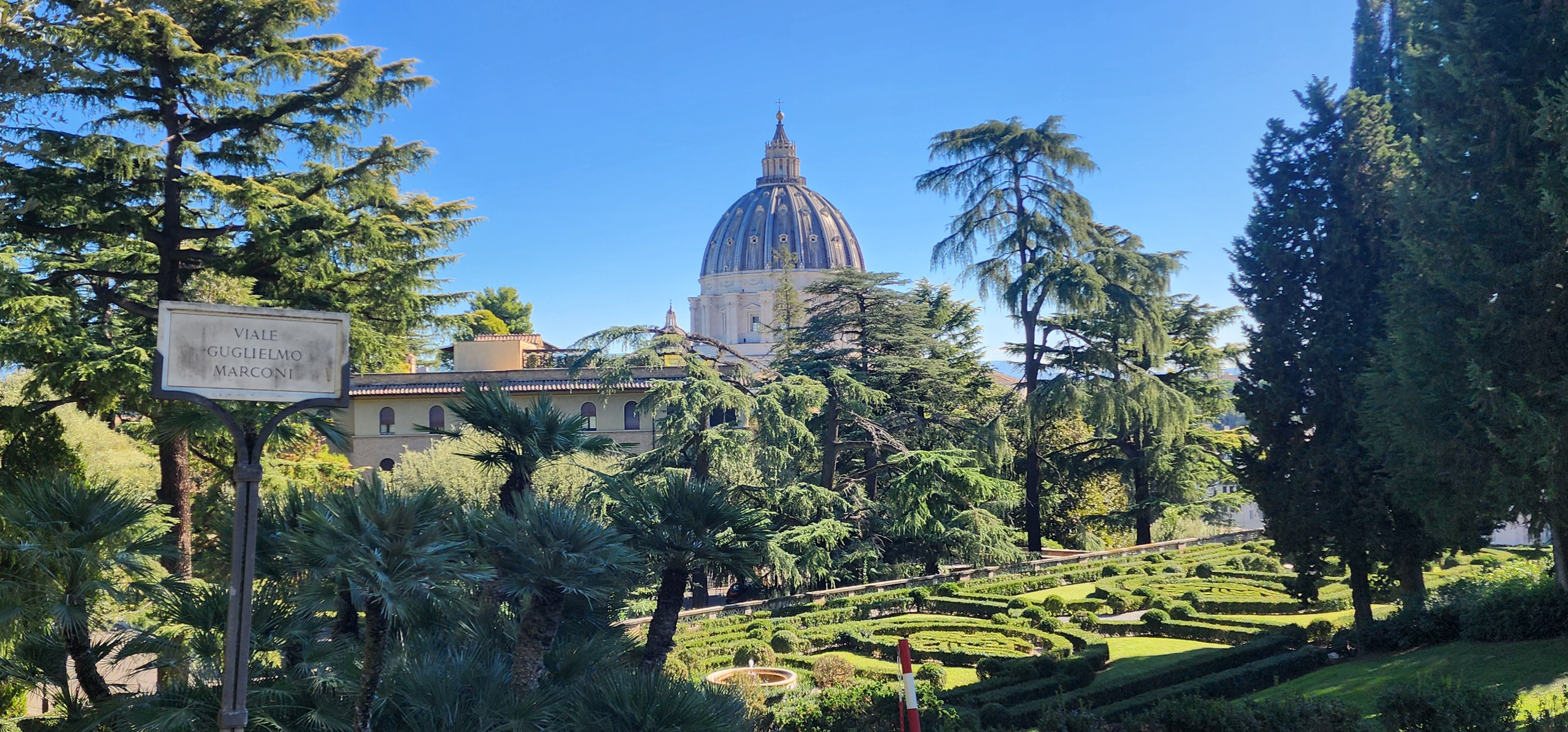
The basilica as seen from the gardens.

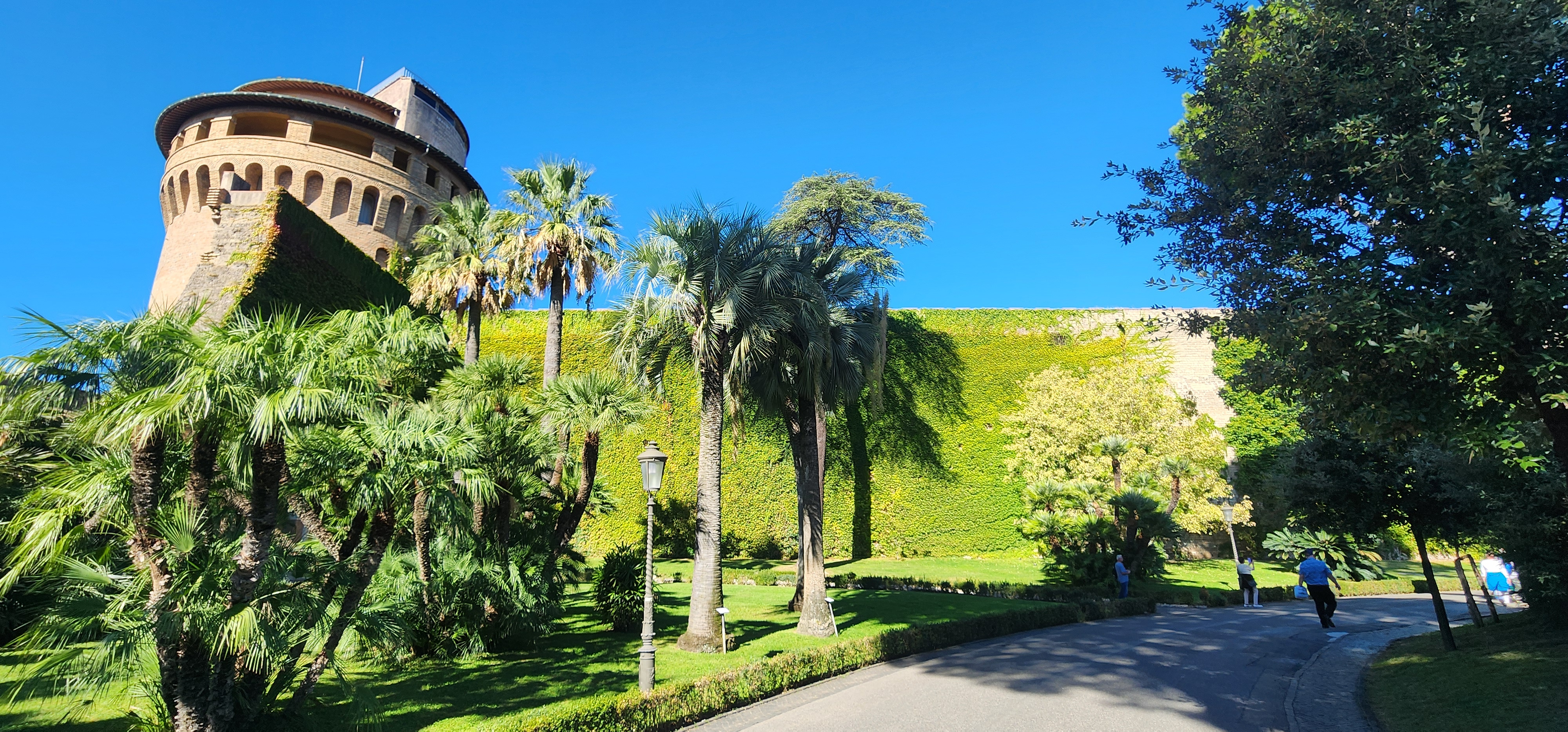
Torre San Giovanni, on an ancient wall originally built by Pope Nicholas III. The tower fell into disuse in the 16th century but was rebuilt in the early 1960s by Pope John XXIII.

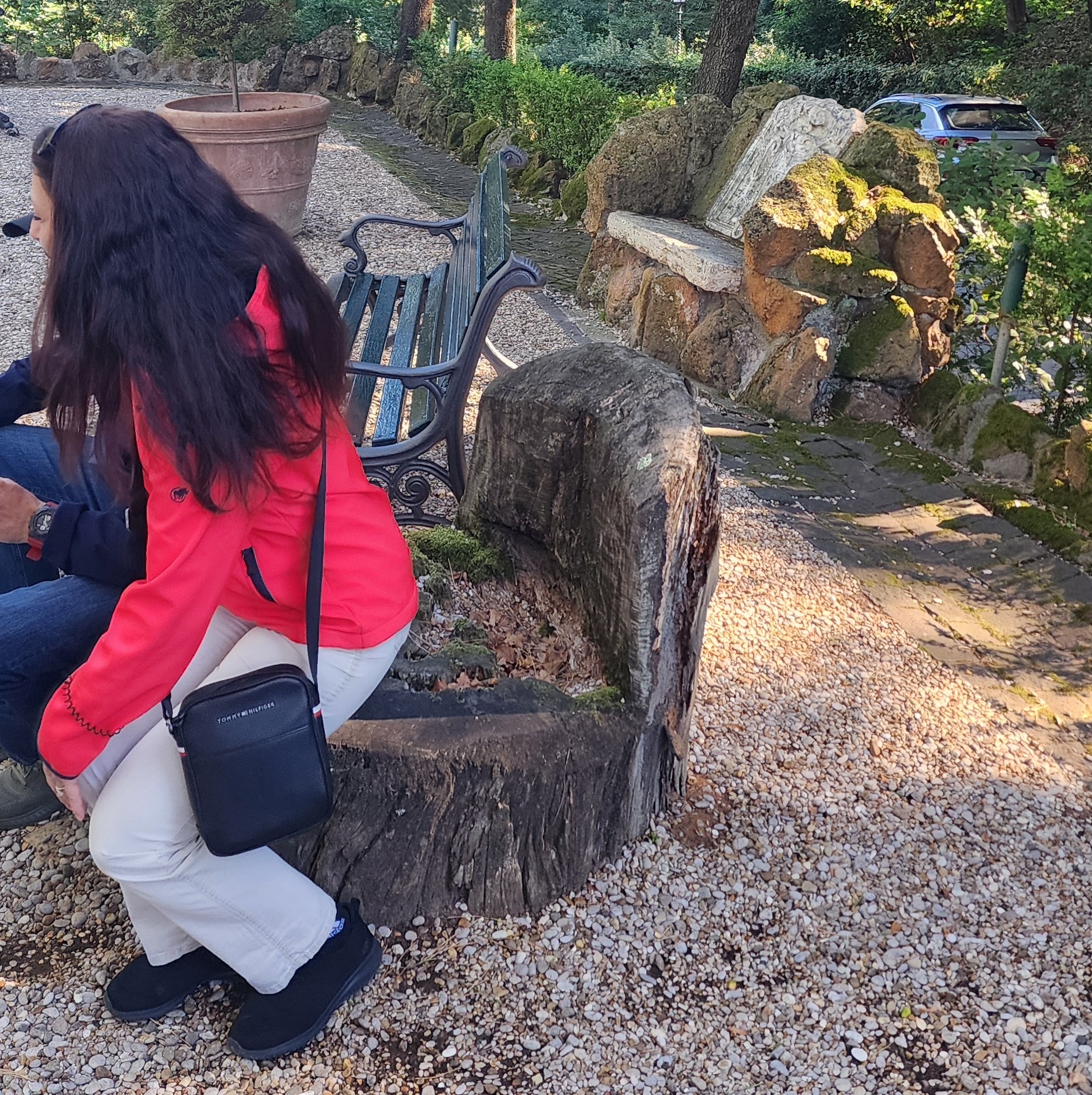
Tourists try out a seat cut from a stump, said to have been the favorite relaxing spot of Pope John Paul II.

== See also ==
- Grotta di Lourdes
- Vatican Climate Forest
- Index of Vatican City-related articles
