= Movinga =

German company (e. 2015)

- Industry: Relocation, Courier and logistics services
- Founded: 2015
- Founders: Finn Haensel, Bastian Knutzen and Chris Maslowski
- Headquarters: Köln
- Area served: Austria, Germany, France, Switzerland, Sweden
- Key people: Dominic Schütz (CEO)
- Website: movinga.com

Movinga is an online platform-based moving company with its official headquarters at Köln, Germany. Movinga was founded in 2015. It specializes in house removals and relocation and can also be used to 'find and book' other listed moving companies, based on the buyer's preference. In late 2024, the company was acquired by the Swiss moving company MoveAgain.

== History ==
Founded by Bastian Knutzen and Chris Maslowski in 2016, the company began by booking household moving services for students online. In May 2015, they moved their headquarters from Vallendar to Berlin. Later, the MVP version of the platform was released - a home removal platform built with Ruby on Rails, PostgreSQL, Grape, Babel. In 2016, the company was active in at least seven countries. Today, Dominic Schütz is the CEO of the company.

== Model ==
Movinga's business model is online based. Customers first need to provide their source and destination via the moving website. The quotation for the job is then exchanged with the customer. Once the customer accepts the quoted price, the process is initiated, and the task completed.

== Capital ==
Movinga has raised a total of $92.9M in funding from over six rounds.

== Awards and recognition ==
Movinga has been awarded as the Service Champion 2020 by Die Welt in the category relocation.

Movinga has received the Deutscher Mittelstandspreis or German Mittelstand Prize for its "valuable contribution to the principles of a social market economy.” The award was presented by the Small and Medium-Size Business Association of the governing Christian Democratic Union.
