= Graswerth =

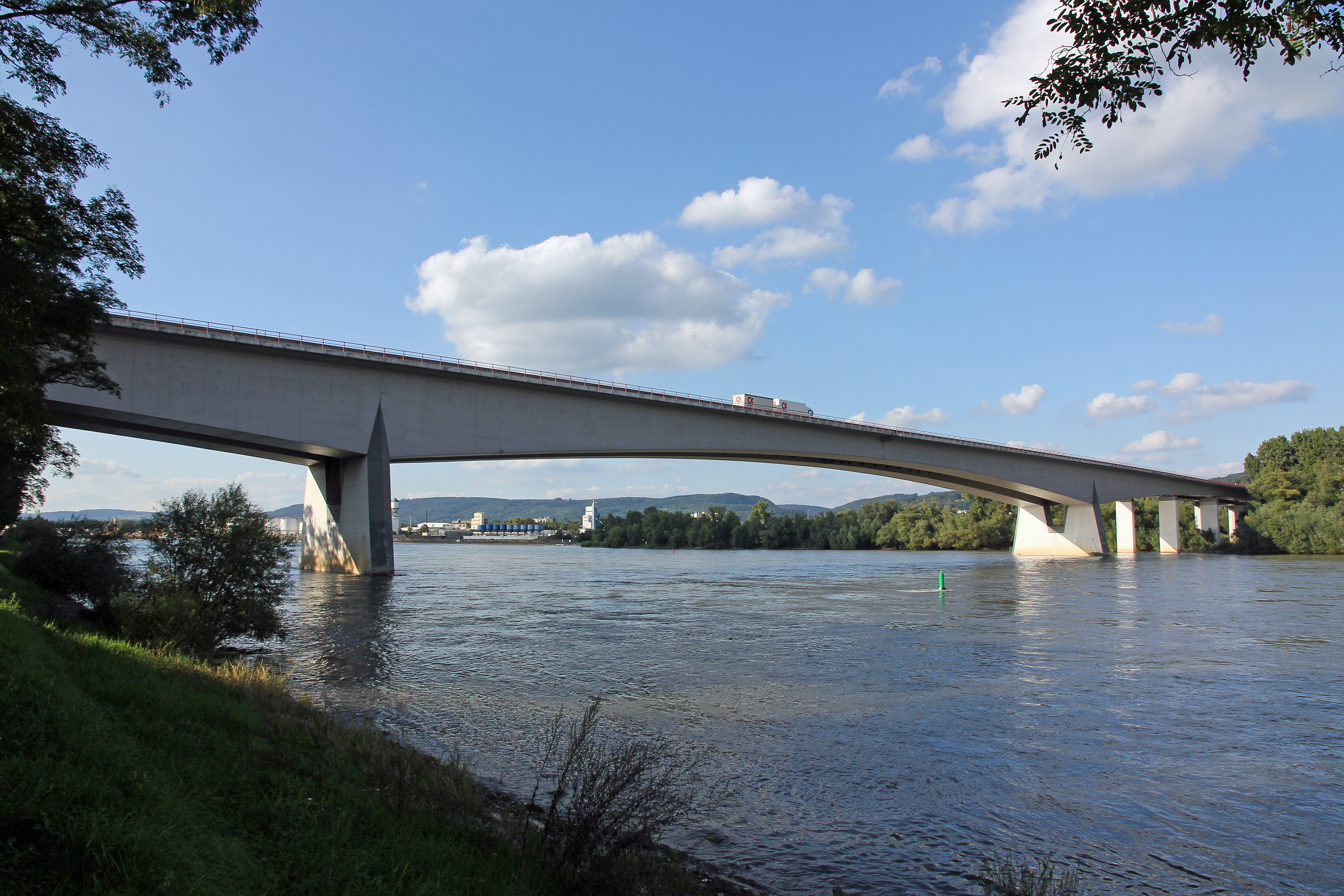
Bendorfer Brücke 02 Koblenz 2014

Graswerth is a small, narrow island on the Rhine river near Koblenz, Germany, in the state of Rhineland-Palatinate. The two kilometer long island is uninhabited and can only be reached by row boat. It is a natural reserve, in which many rare species of birds live. The island is crossed by the A48 Autobahn via the Bendorfer Brücke (Bendorfer Bridge).

Graswerth, together with the Island Niederwerth, forms the Municipality of Niederwerth.
