= Grotta di Lourdes =

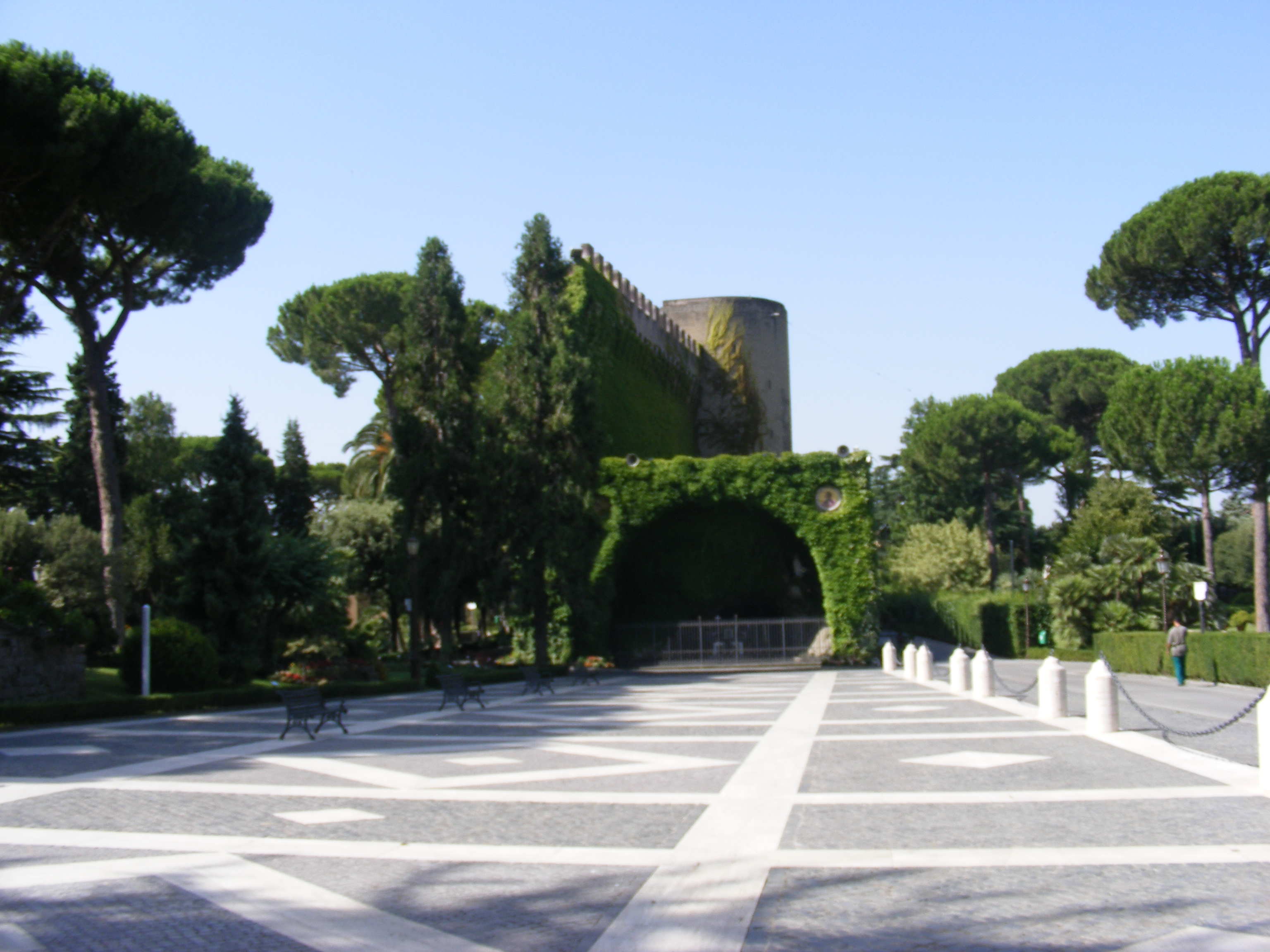
- The Vatican Gardens facing the Grotta di Lourdes
- Click on the map for a fullscreen view

General information
- Location: Vatican City
- Coordinates: 41°54′10″N 012°26′54″E

Grotta di Lourdes (also Grotta della Madonna di Lourdes) is an artificial cave in the Vatican gardens. It was built in 1902–1905 and is a replica of the Lourdes Grotto in France. The context of building this grotto is the vision of the Madonna that a young girl, Bernadette Soubirous, allegedly experienced 18 times. Prior to that the Pope had promulgated the dogma of the Immaculate Conception in 1854.

Pope Francis, two days after his election as Roman Pontiff, visited the Grotto of Our Lady of Lourdes on the afternoon of 15 March 2013 and offered prayers before the statue of the Virgin Mary.

== Background ==
The historical context of creating a grotto in the Vatican Gardens is that on 8 December 1854 the dogma of the Immaculate Conception was proclaimed by Pope Pius IX at a column of the Piazza di Spagna adorned with a statue of the Madonna or Virgin Mary. The context of the dogma was further accentuated by the visionary message given by the Madonna to Bernadette Soubirous, a young girl of 14, that "She" was the "Immaculate Conception" and that a shrine should be established for her at Massabielle near Lourdes. This visionary message had appeared to Soubirous 18 times.

Pope Leo XIII called for a copy of the Grotto of Lourdes to be built and blessed in the Vatican Gardens where the clergy reside, meet and hold liturgical celebrations. On 1 June 1902, the Bishop of Tarbes and Lourdes, François-Xavier Schoepfer, presented the Grotto di Lourdes to Pope Leo XIII in the penultimate year of his pontificate. The reproduction in the Vatican Gardens was made by Constantine Sneider of the Apostolic Palaces. The medallion inscribed at the entrance to the grotto, made by Sneider, shows the images of both popes. Building of the Grotto was facilitated by the Missionaries of the Immaculate Conception throughout the Catholic world. The inaugural function was attended by cardinals, bishops and a large audience when Bishop Schoepfer recorded the universal value of the gift. A formal consecration was held on 28 March 1905 by Pius X when his successor Pius XI was also present.

== Features ==
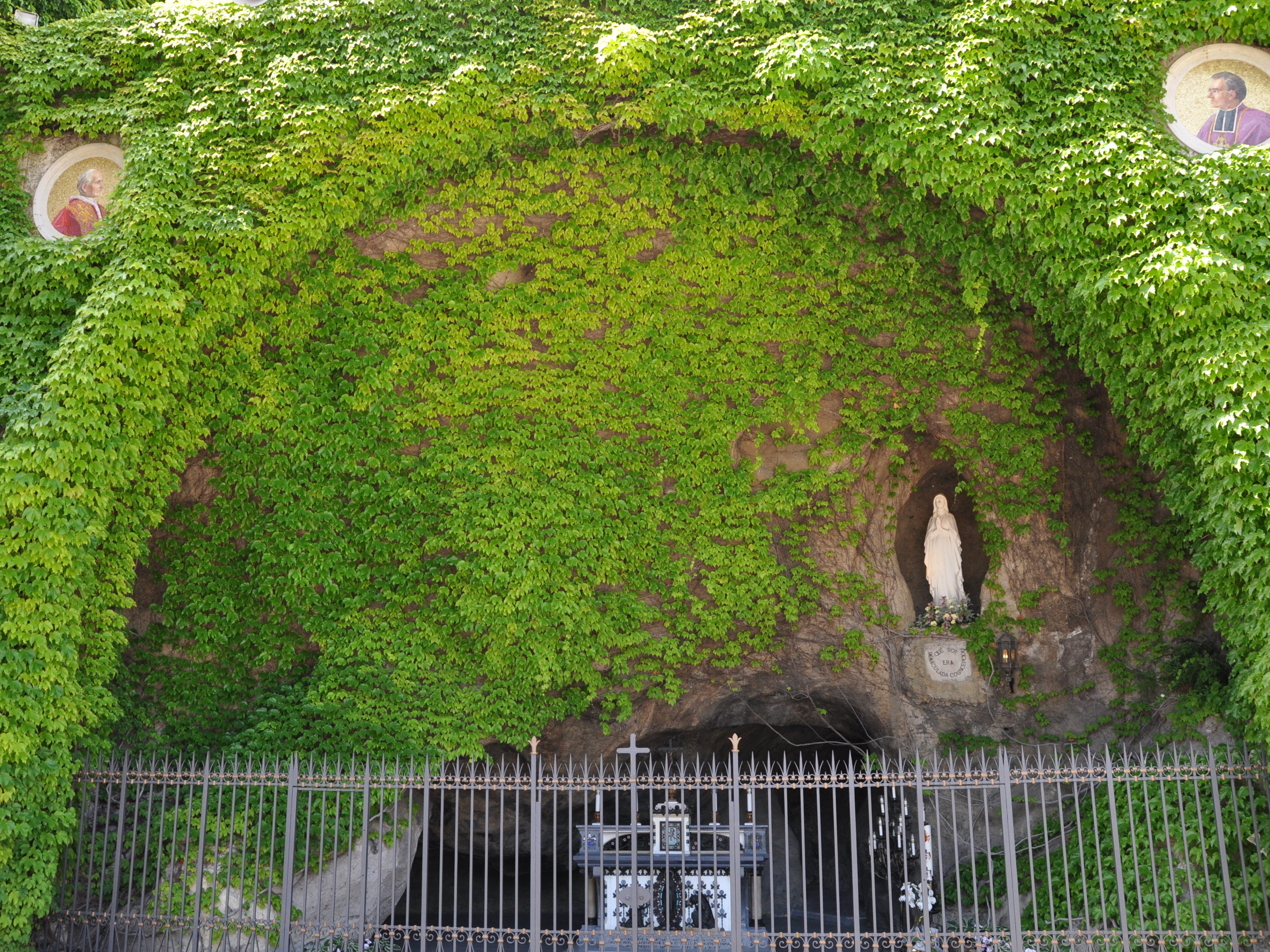
Detail of the cave

The Grotta di Lourdes in the Vatican is smaller than the French original but is on an appropriate scale. Even the surroundings of the church have been replicated. The spire of the Grotto which was fairly tall, was accessed by two flights of stairs, one on each side. However, the spire was ordered to be demolished by Pius XI for reasons of safety. In 1962, the two side stairways up to the spire were also demolished on orders from Pope John XXIII. With this change, the Grotto became a simple structure with an evocative altar and a small statue of the Immaculate. Below this statue there is an inscription of Mary's message to young Bernadette Soubirous (who was beatified in 1925 and canonized in 1933) of the Immaculate Conception.

The square front courtyard of the Grotto was the venue, during the 1930s, for a papal guard of honour on the occasion of the oath-taking ceremony of new recruits joining the papal service.

The original altar of the Lourdes Grotto in France was gifted by the Bishop of Tarbes and Lourdes Pierre-Marie Théas to Pope John XXIII in 1960 and was installed in the Grotta di Lourdes.

Another annual event held every year on 31 May, during the conclusion of the procession, is the visit of the Pope to the Grotto in order to conduct mass. Pope John Paul II visited the Grotta on 31 May 2000, after which he addressed the assembled. Pope Benedict XVI visited the Grotta on 31 May 2011; he used to walk to the Vatican Gardens, visit the Grotto and offer prayers before the image of the Immaculate Conception.

The structure is situated along the wall to Saint John's Tower. Next to the Grotto there is fountain dedicated to the invitation given by Our Lady to Bernadette and also a marble plaque which gives a history in Latin of the building of the Grotto until it was modified under the directives of John XXIII.

== See also ==
- Index of Vatican City-related articles
