= Governor's Palace, Vatican =

Governor's Palace
- Palazzo del Governatorato in Vaticano
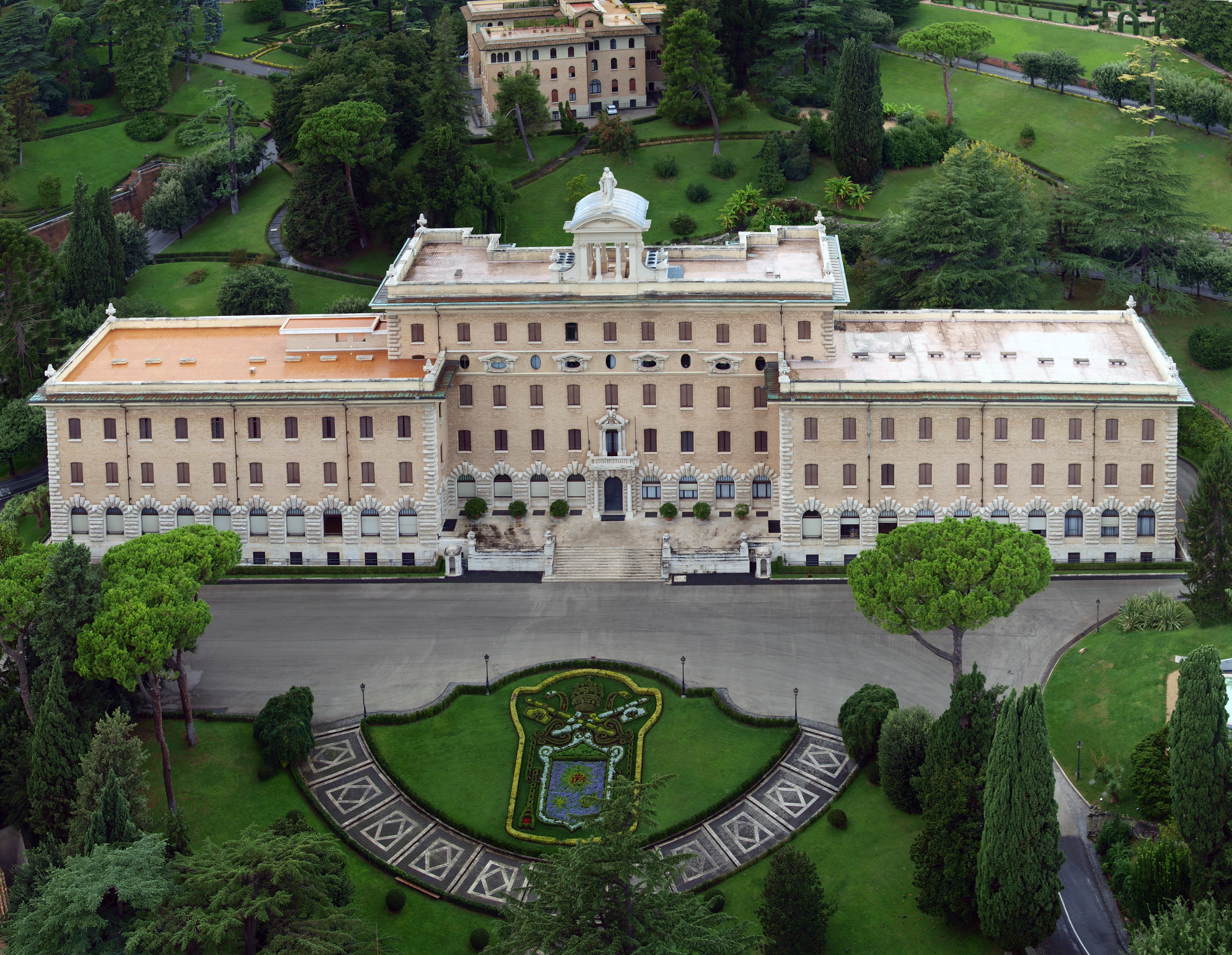
- Governor's Palace
- Interactive map of the Governor's Palace area

General information
- Type: Official residence
- Location: Vatican City
- Coordinates: 41°54′08.57″N 12°27′04.41″E

The Governor's Palace (Italian: Palazzo del Governatorato in Vaticano) is the seat of the Pontifical Commission for Vatican City State. The palace is located in the Vatican Gardens behind St. Peter's Basilica.

== History ==
The palace was formed by joining three adjacent buildings. It was built in the eclectic style between 1927 and 1931 by Giuseppe Momo Piedmont. The Church of Santa Maria Regina della Famiglia, also built by Piedmont is located within the palace complex. The palace suffered considerable damage during the Bombing of the Vatican in World War II.

== Gallery ==
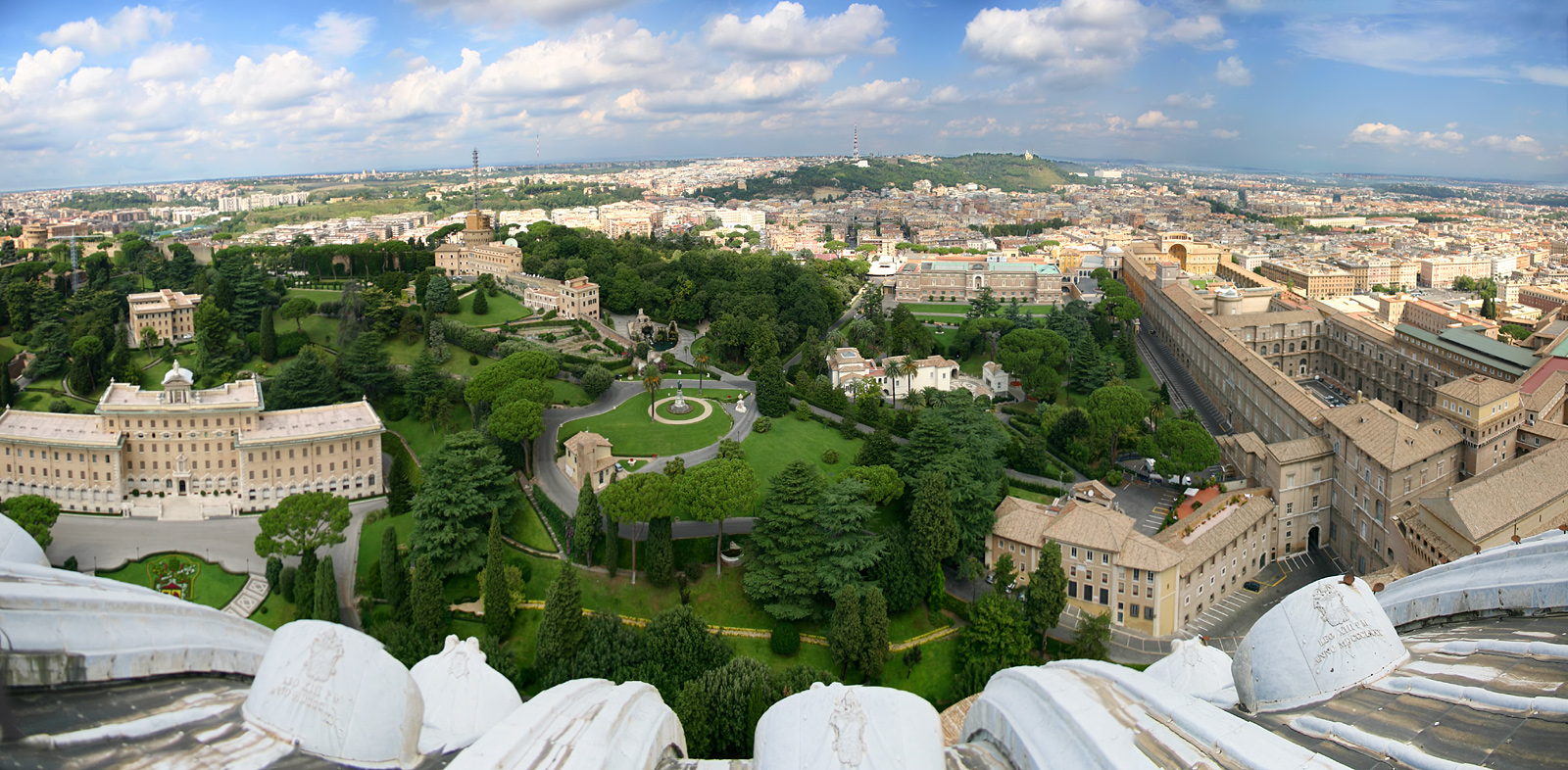
Panorama of Governor's palace and nearby buildings, including the Vatican Gardens as seen from St. Peter's Basilica.

== See also ==
- Index of Vatican City-related articles
