= Niederwerth =

- Municipality
- Coat of arms

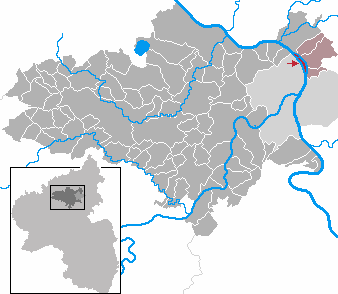
- Location of Niederwerth within Mayen-Koblenz district
- Interactive map of Niederwerth
- Location within Germany Location within Rhineland-Palatinate
- Coordinates: 50°23′44″N 7°36′42″E
- Country: Germany
- State: Rhineland-Palatinate
- District: Mayen-Koblenz
- Municipal assoc.: Vallendar

Government
  - Mayor (2019–24): Horst Klöckner

Area
  - Total: 3.03 km^{2} (1.17 sq mi)
- Elevation: 68 m (223 ft)

Population (2025-12-31)
  - Total: 1,256
  - Density: 415/km^{2} (1,070/sq mi)
- Time zone: UTC+01:00 (CET)
  - Summer (DST): UTC+02:00 (CEST)
- Postal codes: 56179
- Dialling codes: 0261
- Vehicle registration: MYK
- Website: www.niederwerth.de

Niederwerth is a municipality in the district of Mayen-Koblenz in Rhineland-Palatinate, western Germany. It is situated on two islands (one of which, Graswerth, is an uninhabited nature reserve) in the Rhine, opposite the town Vallendar.
