= Vallendar (Verbandsgemeinde) =

- Verbandsgemeinde
- Location of Vallendar within Mayen-Koblenz district
- Interactive map of Vallendar
- Location within Germany Location within Rhineland-Palatinate
- Coordinates: 50°24′N 7°37′E
- Country: Germany
- State: Rhineland-Palatinate
- District: Mayen-Koblenz
- Seat: Vallendar
- Subdivisions: 4 municipalities

Area
  - Total: 26.34 km^{2} (10.17 sq mi)

Population (2025-12-31)
  - Total: 15,963
  - Density: 606.0/km^{2} (1,570/sq mi)
- Time zone: UTC+01:00 (CET)
  - Summer (DST): UTC+02:00 (CEST)
- Website: www.vg-vallendar.de

Vallendar (German pronunciation: [ˈfaləndaʁ]) is a Verbandsgemeinde ("collective municipality") in the district Mayen-Koblenz, in Rhineland-Palatinate, Germany. The seat of the municipality is in Vallendar.

The Verbandsgemeinde Vallendar consists of the following Ortsgemeinden ("local municipalities"):

1. Niederwerth
2. Urbar
3. Vallendar
4. Weitersburg
