= Urbar, Mayen-Koblenz =

Urbar
- Municipality
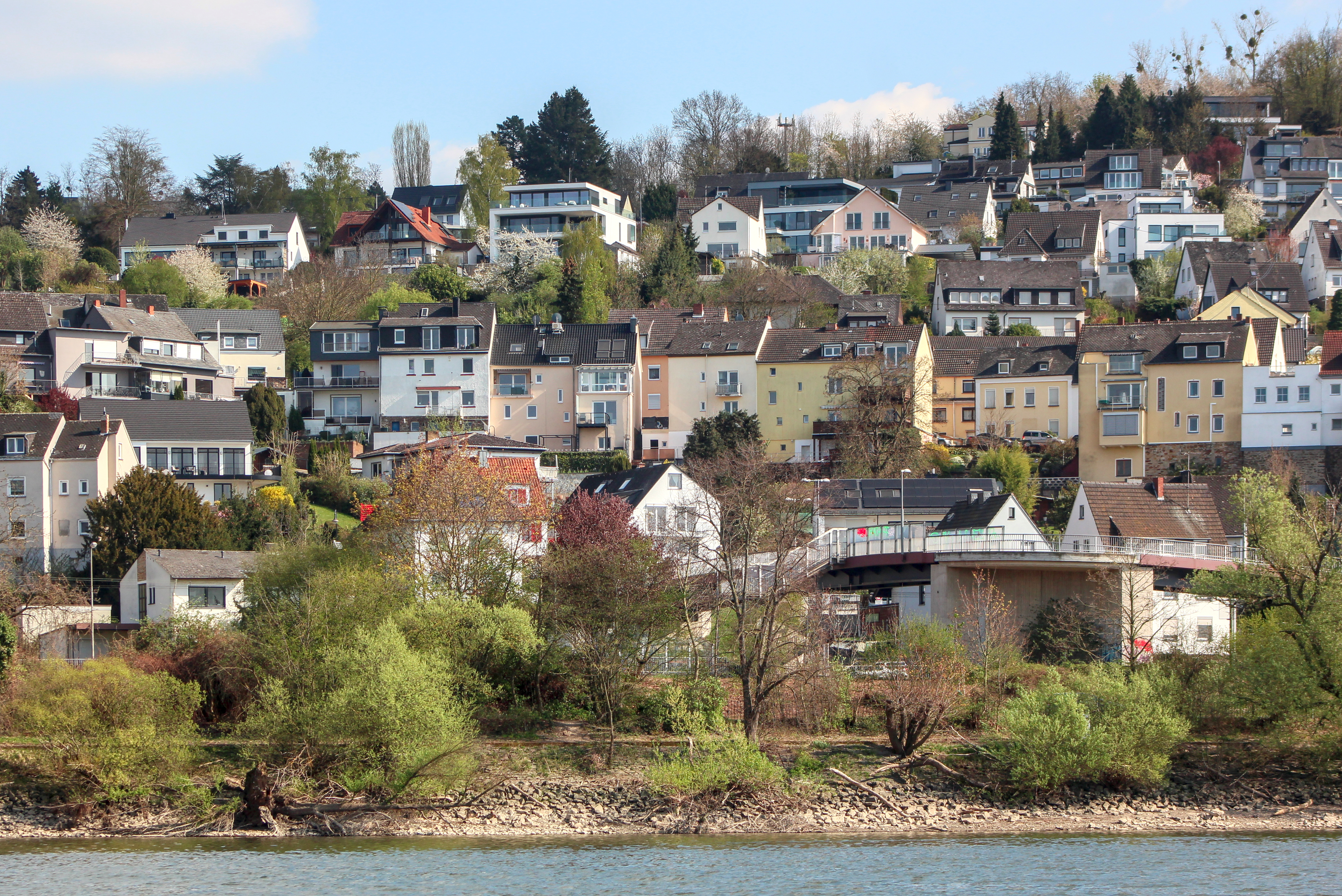

- Coat of arms

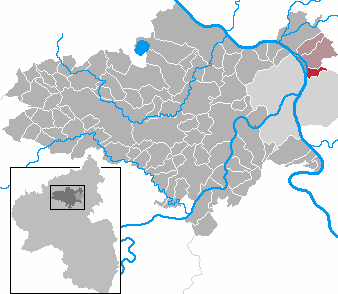
- Location of Urbar within Mayen-Koblenz district
- Interactive map of Urbar
- Location within Germany Location within Rhineland-Palatinate
- Coordinates: 50°22′50″N 7°37′34″E
- Country: Germany
- State: Rhineland-Palatinate
- District: Mayen-Koblenz
- Municipal assoc.: Vallendar

Government
  - Mayor (2019–24): Karin Küsel (SPD)

Area
  - Total: 3.46 km^{2} (1.34 sq mi)
- Elevation: 100 m (330 ft)

Population (2025-12-31)
  - Total: 3,189
  - Density: 922/km^{2} (2,390/sq mi)
- Time zone: UTC+01:00 (CET)
  - Summer (DST): UTC+02:00 (CEST)
- Postal codes: 56182
- Dialling codes: 0261
- Vehicle registration: MYK
- Website: www.urbar.de

Urbar is a municipality in the district of Mayen-Koblenz in Rhineland-Palatinate, western Germany.
