= Weitersburg =

- Municipality
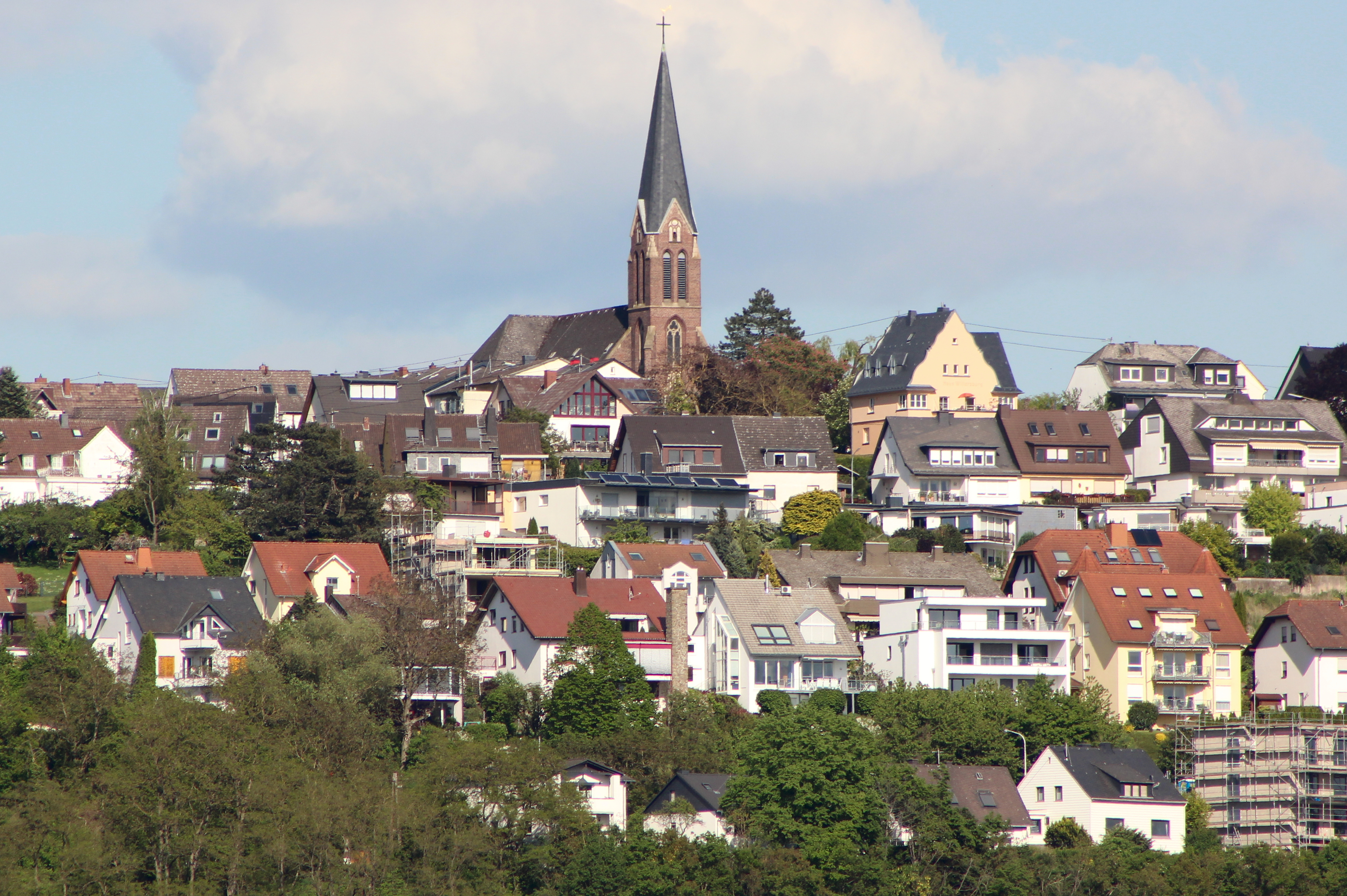

- Coat of arms

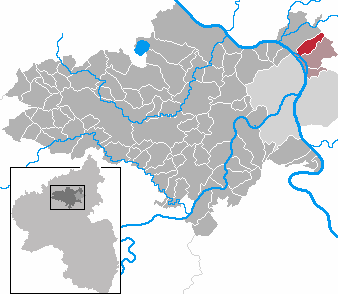
- Location of Weitersburg within Mayen-Koblenz district
- Interactive map of Weitersburg
- Location within Germany Location within Rhineland-Palatinate
- Coordinates: 50°24′40.25″N 7°35′47.61″E
- Country: Germany
- State: Rhineland-Palatinate
- District: Mayen-Koblenz
- Municipal assoc.: Vallendar

Government
  - Mayor (2019–24): Jochen Währ

Area
  - Total: 6.62 km^{2} (2.56 sq mi)
- Elevation: 184 m (604 ft)

Population (2025-12-31)
  - Total: 2,472
  - Density: 373/km^{2} (967/sq mi)
- Time zone: UTC+01:00 (CET)
  - Summer (DST): UTC+02:00 (CEST)
- Postal codes: 56191
- Dialling codes: 02622 und 0261
- Vehicle registration: MYK
- Website: www.weitersburg.de

Weitersburg (German pronunciation: [ˈvaɪtɐsbʊʁk]) is a municipality in the district of Mayen-Koblenz in Rhineland-Palatinate, western Germany.
