= Vallendar =

- Town
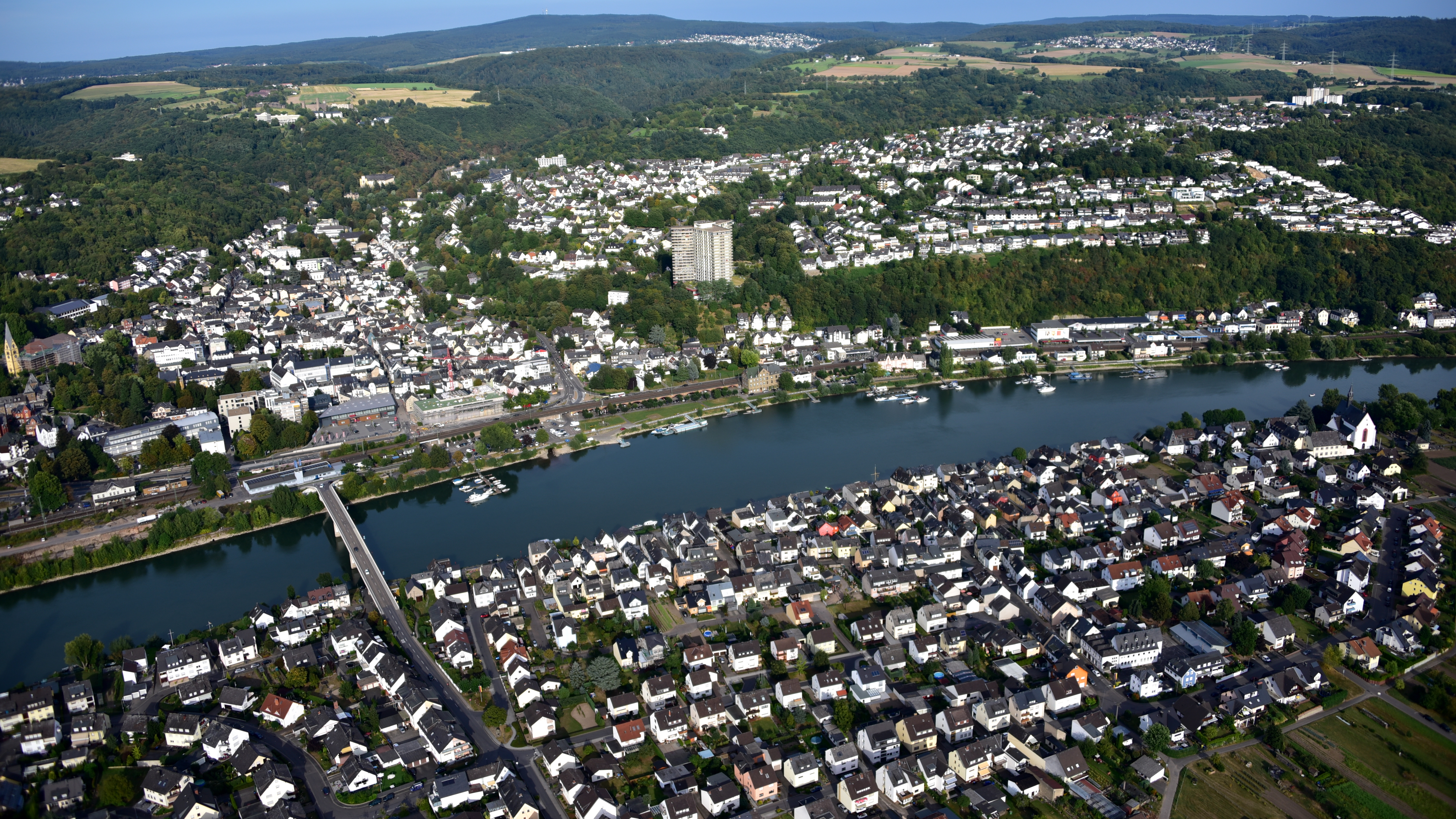
- Aerial view

- Coat of arms

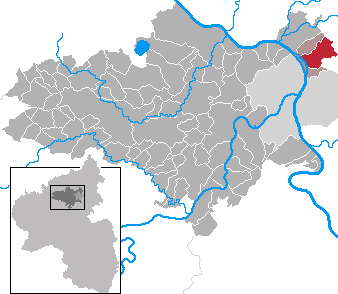
- Location of Vallendar within Mayen-Koblenz district
- Interactive map of Vallendar
- Location within Germany Location within Rhineland-Palatinate
- Coordinates: 50°23′49.69″N 7°37′19.28″E
- Country: Germany
- State: Rhineland-Palatinate
- District: Mayen-Koblenz
- Municipal assoc.: Vallendar
- Subdivisions: 5

Government
  - Mayor (2019–24): Wolfgang Heitmann (SPD)

Area
  - Total: 13.22 km^{2} (5.10 sq mi)
- Elevation: 99 m (325 ft)

Population (2025-12-31)
  - Total: 9,046
  - Density: 684.3/km^{2} (1,772/sq mi)
- Time zone: UTC+01:00 (CET)
  - Summer (DST): UTC+02:00 (CEST)
- Postal codes: 56179
- Dialling codes: 0261
- Vehicle registration: MYK
- Website: www.vallendar-rhein.de

Vallendar (German pronunciation: [ˈfaləndaʁ]) is a town in the district Mayen-Koblenz, in Rhineland-Palatinate, Germany. It is situated on the right bank of the Rhine, approx. 4 km north-east of Koblenz. Vallendar is the seat of the Verbandsgemeinde ("collective municipality") Vallendar.

== Geography ==
=== Situation ===
The town of Vallendar spreads out on the right side of the Mittelrhein opposing the island of Niederwerth, where several creek valleys from the Westerwald meet the Rhine valley. It is situated 5.7 km (3.5 mi) north of Koblenz and 12.3 km (7.6 mi) south of Neuwied. East of Vallendar rises the Westerwald, on the other side of the river the Eifel.

=== Districts ===
- Mallendar
- Mallendarer Berg
- Schönstatt
- Gumschlag
- Gartenstadt

== History ==
Vallendar is first mentioned around 830–840 AD as the property of the Archbishop of Trier; it was probably, however, of Celtic origin and a lot older (700–600 BC). In 1143 Schoenstatt Abbey was founded. In 1232 the Count of Sayn took possession of the land and began building a castle at the northern edge of the town in 1240. Its foundations today support the Marienburg.

From the 14th century the Archbishop of Trier regained more and more power over the land to become proprietor again in 1681 and in 1767 (for good). Today the Lion of Sayn and the Cross of Trier are evidence of this history in Vallendar's coat of arms. During the Middle Ages a Palatine high court was located in Vallendar. 1802 the proprietorship went to the Count of Nassau-Weilburg; in 1815 it fell to the Kingdom of Prussia. A rich business life is the reason why Frederick William IV of Prussia granted town rights to Vallendar in 1856. In 1939 Mallendar was added to the town. It was the scene of a military action by the 23rd US Infantry. From 1954 to the 1970s numerous new construction areas were established. Since 1973 the skyline has been dominated by the "Humboldthöhe".

Today Vallendar's appearance is influenced mostly by the internationally renowned Schönstatt and the WHU – Otto Beisheim School of Management and its students.

=== Population development ===
Date	Total
December 1, 1910	4462
December 31, 2004	8856
June 30, 2005	8814
December 31, 2006	8763

== Politics ==
=== City Hall ===
Party	Seats	Parliamentary group leader	Ref.
Christian Democratic Union	11	Kurt Pfahl	
Social Democratic Party	8	Dieter Klöckner	
Free Democratic Party	2	Günter Seehaus	
Citizens for Vallendar	2	Joachim Karbach	
Free Voters	1	Peter Backes	

== Economy and infrastructure ==
=== Companies ===
- Baldus Medizintechnik GmbH is a consulting and service company specialised in the medical gas supply for hospitals.

=== Traffic ===
Vallendar is connected to the B 42 and A 48, with the exit Bendorf/Neuwied/Vallendar leading into the city center via B 42.

Vallendar has a train station on the Rheinstrecke.

The KEVAG busses 7/7a and 8/8a connect Vallendar to Koblenz, Bendorf and Höhr-Grenzhausen.

== Education ==
- WHU – Otto Beisheim School of Management (formerly: Wissenschaftliche Hochschule für Unternehmensführung), is a private university founded in 1984 in Koblenz.
- Schönstätter Marienschule, state recognized, private girls' school
- Philosophisch-Theologische Hochschule Vallendar (philosophic-theologic school) of the Pallottines is occupied with the formation of priests and church-related people

== Sights ==
- Roman Catholic St. Marzellinus and St. Petrus Church (constructed 1837-41 by Koblenz-based architect Johann Claudius von Lassaulx as one of the biggest church constructions in this area of the century)
- Protestant Lukas-church, constructed 1884-85 by Wiesbaden-based architect Friedrich Lang, typical Protestant 19th century church
- Former St.-Josef-Krankenhaus, 1856-59 by Cologne-based architect Vincenz Statz
- Wiltberger Hof, 1695–98
- Former school in Eulerstraße, 1844-45 by Ferdinand Nebel
- Haus d'Ester, so called Marienburg (formerly seat to the d'Ester family, 1773 by Nikolaus Lauxen); today seat of the WHU – Otto Beisheim School of Management
- Marienburg-chappel
- Schoenstatt Shrine

== Persons of interest ==
- 1800: Theodor von Zwehl, bavarian politician
- 1805: Johann Baptist Kraus, Priest Arenberg

Lived in Vallendar:

- Josef Kentenich, Founder of the international Schoenstatt Movement
- Emilie Engel
- Gerhard Henschel, author of the book Kindheitsroman
- Oliver Samwer, Founder of Alando (bought by eBay.de) and Jamba!

== Twin cities ==
- Cercy-la-Tour, France
- Cranleigh, UK
- Murów, Poland

== Trivia ==
A city named "Vallendar" is included in the PC game Call of Duty 2. This fictional city also lies on the river Rhine. The players task is to fight retreating German soldiers during World War II. Other than its location on the river the virtual Vallendar has nothing in common with its real world counterpart.
