= Virneburg Castle =

Historical Landmark in Germany

Virneburg
- Virneburg
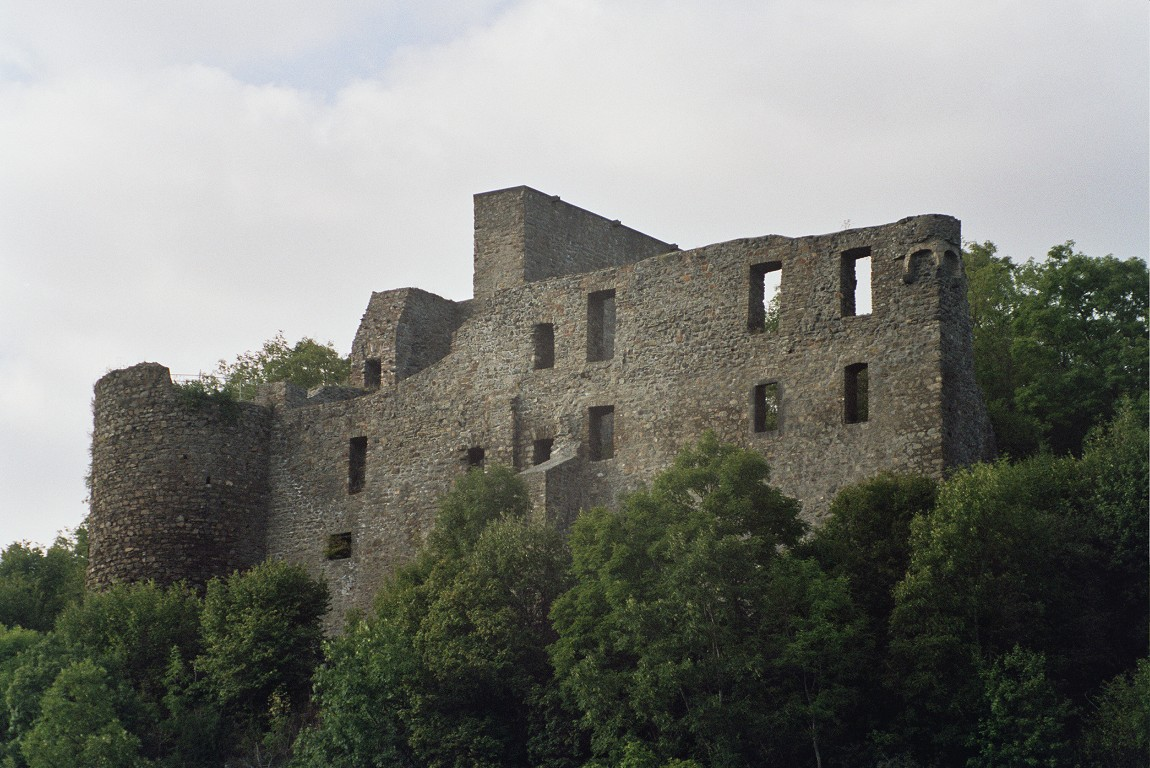
- The ruins of the Virneburg

Site information
- Type: hill castle
- Code: DE-RP
- Condition: Enceinte, corner tower

Location
- Coordinates: 50°20′35.10″N 7°4′43.97″E
- Height: 430 m above sea level (NHN)

Site history
- Built: Second half of the 12th century

Garrison information
- Occupants: counts

Virneburg Castle (German: Burgruine Virneburg) is a ruined hill castle on a slate hill, 430 m above sea level (NHN), around which the Nitzbach stream flows. It stands above the village of Virneburg in the county of Mayen-Koblenz in the German state of Rhineland-Palatinate.

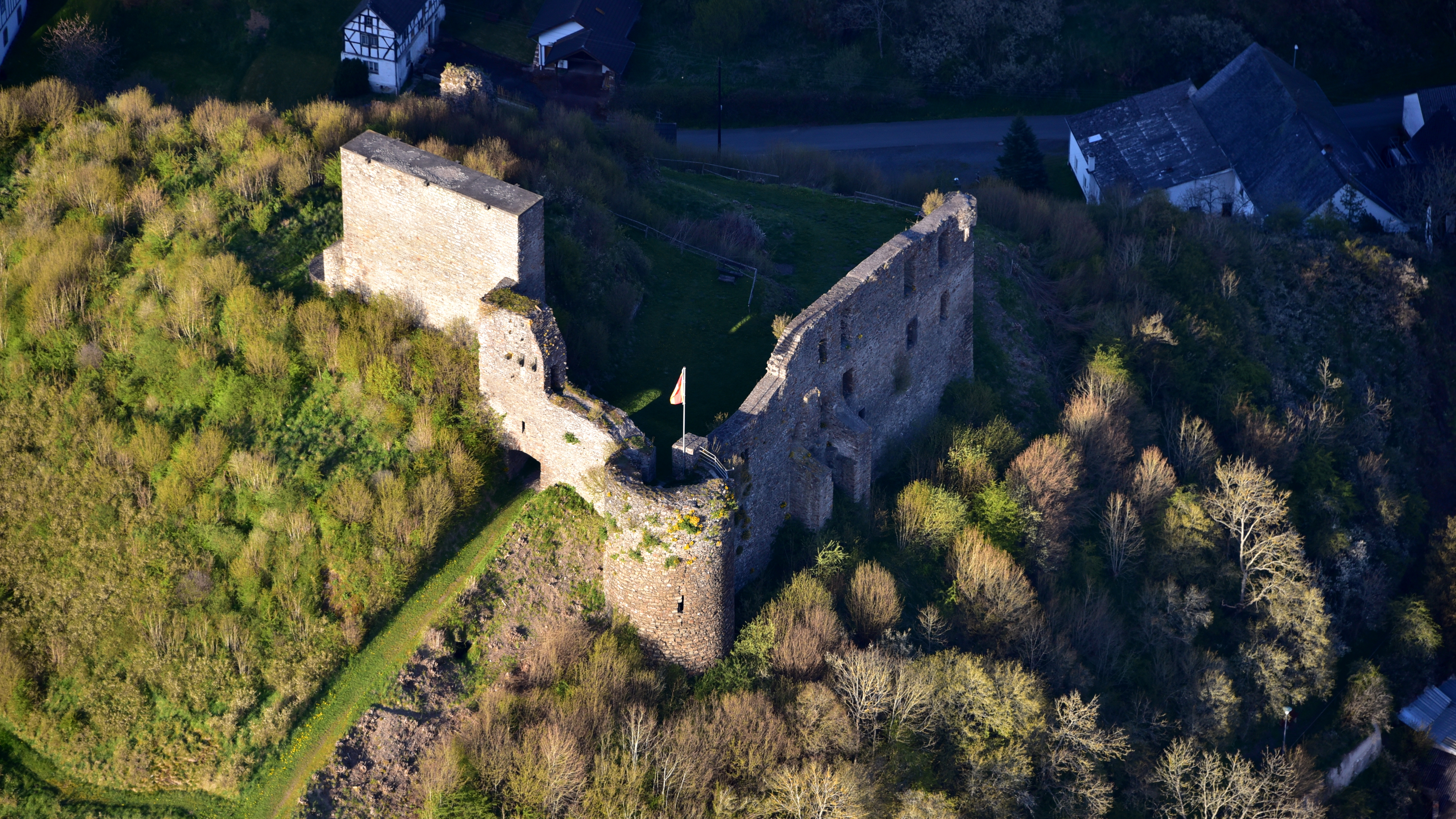
Virneburg, 2016 aerial photograph

== History ==
The castle was probably built in the second half of the 12th century as a fief of the count palatine. The first record of the castle can be found in an 1192 document, in which the brothers Godfrey and Frederick of Virneburg gave their castle Vernenburgh together with the county and all its estate to the Archbishop of Trier, John I, as a fiefdom. This document is not preserved in the original, the 16th-century copy is either a faulty translation or a forgery due to the wording contained therein, which was not yet customary around 1200.

The lords of Virneburg, later elevated to the rank of count, are first mentioned in a document by the Archbishop of Trier, Poppo, in 1042 where a certain Bernhardus de Virneburch is recorded. At that time, feudal sovereignty had passed to the counts of Sayn, but John of Sayn relinquished it in 1358 to the counts palatine, with the exception of the castle, which was still mentioned in 1506 as a male fief to the counts of Sayn, even though the counts of Virneburg no longer recognised their feudal sovereignty.

In 1339, Count Rupert of Virneburg gave part of the castle to the Elector of Trier, Baldwin to pay off a debt. It refers for the first time to the hoechste thurn ("highest tower"), probably the old bergfried built when the castle was constructed.

In 1414, the counts of Virneburg had to hand over the rest of the castle to the Archbishop, Werner of Falkenstein, to whom the county had always been a thorn in the side. Only a few years later, however, the people of Virneburg succeeded in redeeming their castle from being an enfeoffment of Trier. On the death of Count Cunos of Virneburg in 1545, the Virneburg family died out.

Its heirs were the counts of Mark-Arenberg and then the counts of Manderscheid-Blankenheim before being confiscated a little later by Trier as a terminated fiefdom. Following an objection by the counts of Manderscheid-Schleiden, however, it was returned to them in 1549 as a fiefdom. The property was acquired in 1600 by Löwenstein-Wertheim.

An inventory of the castle made at that time lists twelve rooms. The bergfried had been replaced and was given a new chemin de ronde in 1623, but by 1663 the castle was described as being very dilapidated, especially "on the sides with the high walls and well". A restoration was postponed at that time and, in 1665, the walls in the front and upper courtyard of the castle had "completely fallen down and unrestored". In 1670, the dilapidated bergfried was demolished and rebuilt the following year. The dilapidated enceinte was repaired and the most necessary construction work was carried out in the castle.

When the French invaded the Eifel, the castle was blown up in 1689, the tower was completely destroyed, its residential buildings went up in flames, and the enceinte was slighted.

On the initiative of the Royal District Court of Adenau, the castle ruin was sold publicly on 19 January 1914 for 1,080 Marks to the Rhenish Society for the Preservation of Monuments and Landscape (Rheinischer Verein für Denkmalpflege und Landschaftsschutz).

== Description ==
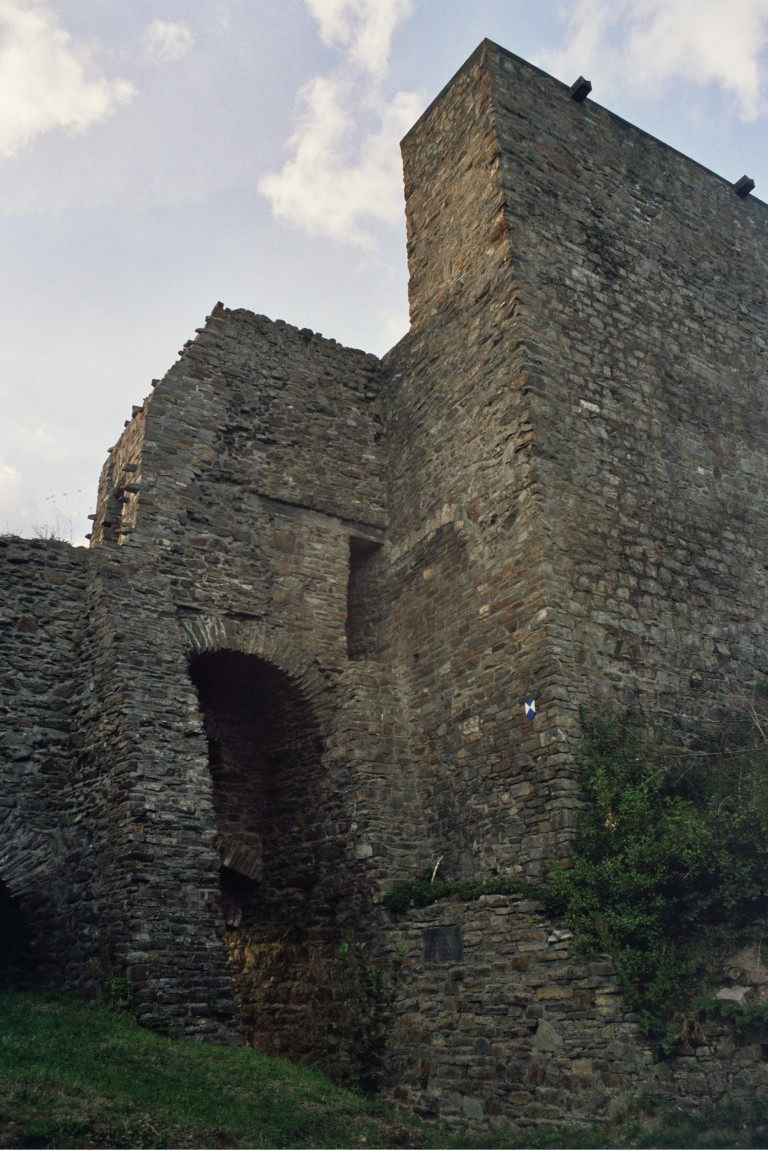
The ruins of Virneburg – part of the shield wall

The remains of the castle are located on a slate dome surrounded by the Nitzbach stream on three sides. The kuppe climbs steeply to a height of 80 metres and its elliptical outline defines the layout of the castle.

A path starting at the south-east corner of the castle hill ends after about five minutes climb on the terrain of the old south-east zwinger, which was reinforced at its south corner by a round tower. The walls of this zwinger have been destroyed except for a few remains, only the shape of terrain makes the course of the wall still discernible.

Through a gate in the adjacent defensive wall of the inner bailey to the west, one reaches the heart of the castle, which used to be densely packed with buildings apart from a narrow courtyard.

The original main entrance to the castle was in the west. Here, the inner bailey had a spacious semicircular outer bailey in front of it, which was accessible through a gatehouse and was reinforced by a round tower on the southern wall of the zwinger. Along the southern zwinger wall, the path led to the surviving gate of the main castle, which was dominated by a mighty bergfried, which has disappeared today. In front of the gate itself, the ogival arch bridge over the neck ditch is still visible, the half on the gate side used to be completed by a drawbridge which no longer exists.

Just as with the Virneburgs' castle of Löwenburg above Monreal, in front of the Bergfried was a shield wall, which has largely survived and is about 3 metres thick and still 18 metres high. It has been built painstakingly of brick and on its crown was a chemin de ronde. The probably continued to the north of the present structure. On this wall, probably built as part of the original castle, the two-storey gatehouse and other buildings of the inner bailey were added.

To the right of the castle gate at the corner of the wall is a round tower with a square interior, which is still 15 metres high. It is followed by the line of the residential building, from which a small square tower, 3 metres wide, projects. The palas itself is still two storeys high; it was not given its present appearance until the 16th century. Outside, on the more weathered masonry, is an older, filled-in basement with two square windows, its divisions can still be seen on the basalt consoles. The base of the eastern outer wall of the palas is still preserved. This continued to the north and formed the outer wall of other buildings.

== Literature ==
- Klaus Markowitz: Zur Geschichte des Hauses und der Burg Virneburg. In: Rheinische Heimatpfleg. 42. Jg., Nr. 4, 2005, ISSN 0342-1805, pp. 263–273.
- Horst Schmidt: Ruine Virneburg, Landkreis Mayen-Koblenz. Baugeschichtliche Beobachtungen an einer Eifelburg. In: Abenteuer Archäologie. No. 8, 2006/2007, ISSN 1615-7125, pp. 8–15.
- Josef Busley und Heinrich Neu: Kunstdenkmäler des Kreises Mayen, L. Schwann, Düsseldorf, 1941, pp. 425–433.
