= Hummel International =

Danish manufacturing company of sportswear

Hummel International Sport & Leisure A/S
- Type: Subsidiary
- Industry: Sports equipment
- Founded: 1923; 103 years ago in Hamburg, Germany
- Founder: Albrech & Ludwig Messmer
- Headquarters: Aarhus, Denmark
- Area served: Worldwide
- Products: Sportswear, footwear
- Revenue: DKK 1.858 billion (€250 million) in 2021
- Parent: Thornico Group
- Website: www.hummel.net

Hummel International Sport & Leisure A/S, commonly known as Hummel (stylized hummel), is a German-founded Danish manufacturing company of sportswear brand based in Aarhus. It is owned by Thornico. The Hummel logo is a stylized bumblebee, as Hummel is German for "bumblebee".

== History ==
The company was founded in 1923 by Max Albrecht Ludwig Messmer and his father Michael Messmer under the name "Messmer & Co" in Hamburg, Germany; that same year, the Messmer brothers introduced the first football boots to the world. Hummel became Danish after being taken over by Bernhard Weckenbrock in 1956, who moved its base to Kevelaer, North Rhine-Westphalia. Since 1999, Hummel has been a part of the Danish Thornico Group founded by Christian and Thor Stadil.

== Products and clients ==
The company currently manufactures apparel for football, rugby league, futsal, handball, basketball, shinty, volleyball and esports teams. Moreover, the company also offers apparel and footwear for adults and children alongside its fashion sub-brand, Hummel HIVE.

Being one of the oldest sportswear brands in the business with roots in football and handball, Hummel has previously been worn by football teams such as Real Madrid, Red Star Belgrade, Sunderland, Southampton, Aston Villa, Benfica, Coventry City and the Danish national team. In 2025, they signed a multi-year league wide partnership with The Canadian Premier League.

In 2016, they created a hijab-friendly uniform for the women's Afghanistan national team, debuting the uniform on International Women's Day.
