= Meurer =

Meurer is a surname. Notable people with the surname include:

- Hugo Meurer (1869–1960), German vice-admiral of the Kaiserliche Marine
- Manfred Meurer (1919–1944), German Luftwaffe pilot
- Markus Meurer (born 1959), German outsider artist
- Nelson Meurer (1942–2020), Brazilian politician
- Willi Meurer (1915–1981), German cyclist
