= Löwenburg and Philippsburg =

Castle ruins in Monreal, Germany

- Löwenburg, Burg Monreal, Philippsburg, das Rech
- Monreal
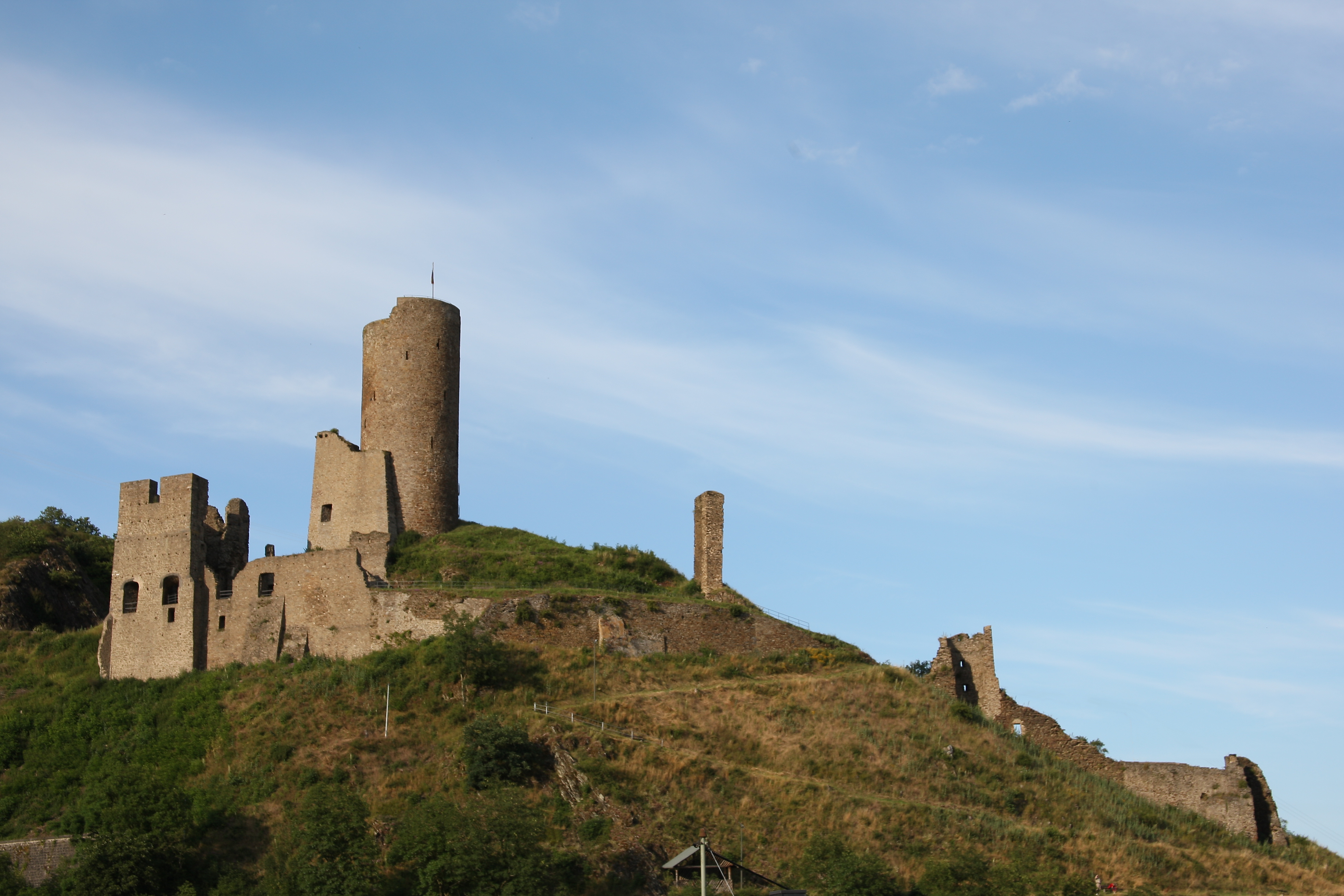
- Ruins of the Löwenburg above Monreal

Site information
- Type: hill castle, spur castle
- Code: DE-RP
- Condition: ruin

Location
- Location within Rhineland-Palatinate Location within Germany
- Coordinates: 50°18′1.39″N 7°9′37.21″E
- Height: 350 m above sea level (NHN)

Site history
- Built: 13th century

Garrison information
- Occupants: counts

On a hill spur above the Eifel village of Monreal in Germany's Elzbach valley, at a height of 350 m above sea level (NHN), stand two neighbouring ruined hill castles: the Löwenburg, also called Monreal Castle (German: Burg Monreal), and the Philippsburg. The latter is also known locally as das Rech (the Deer).

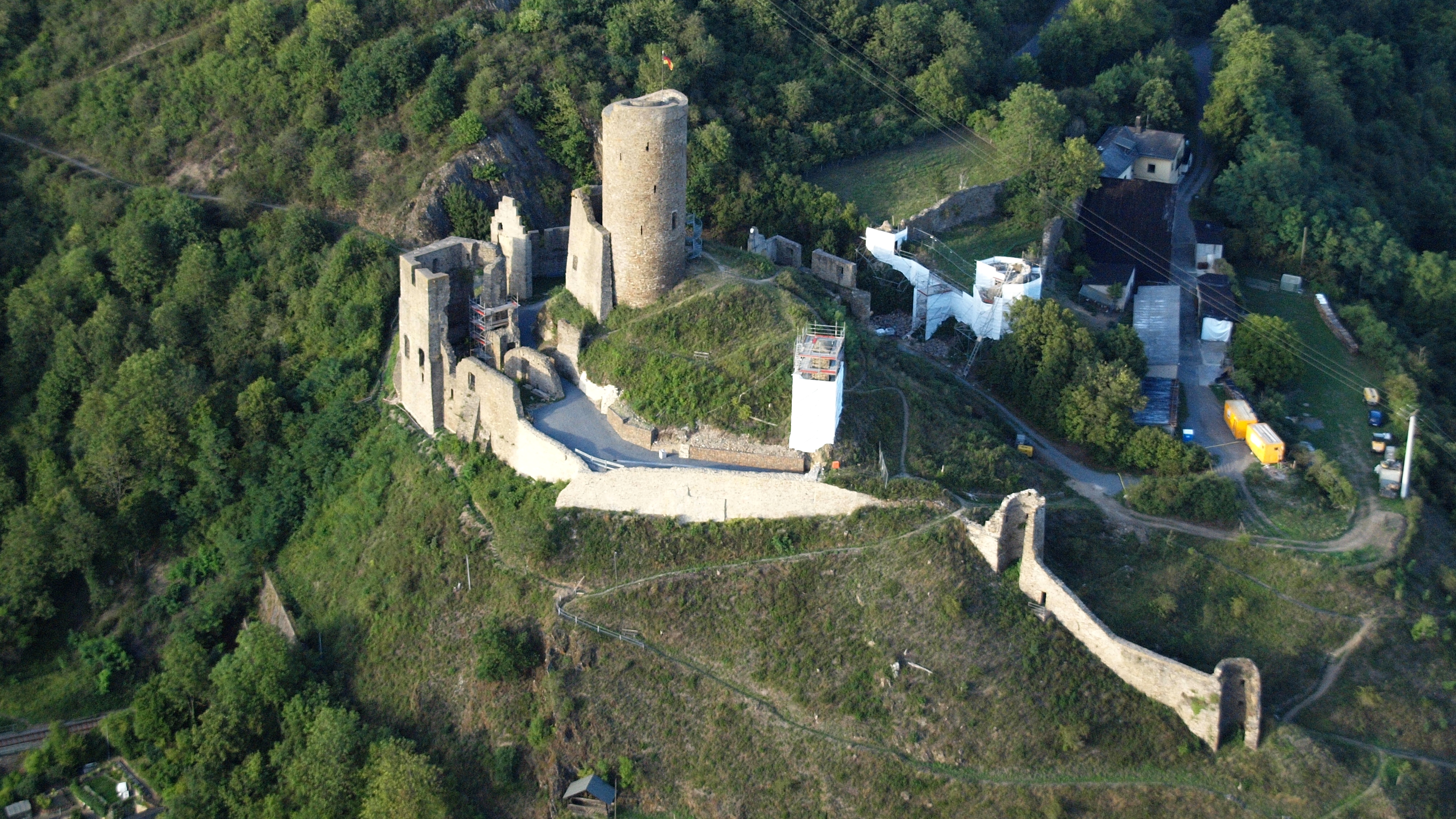
The Löwenburg, 2015 aerial photograph

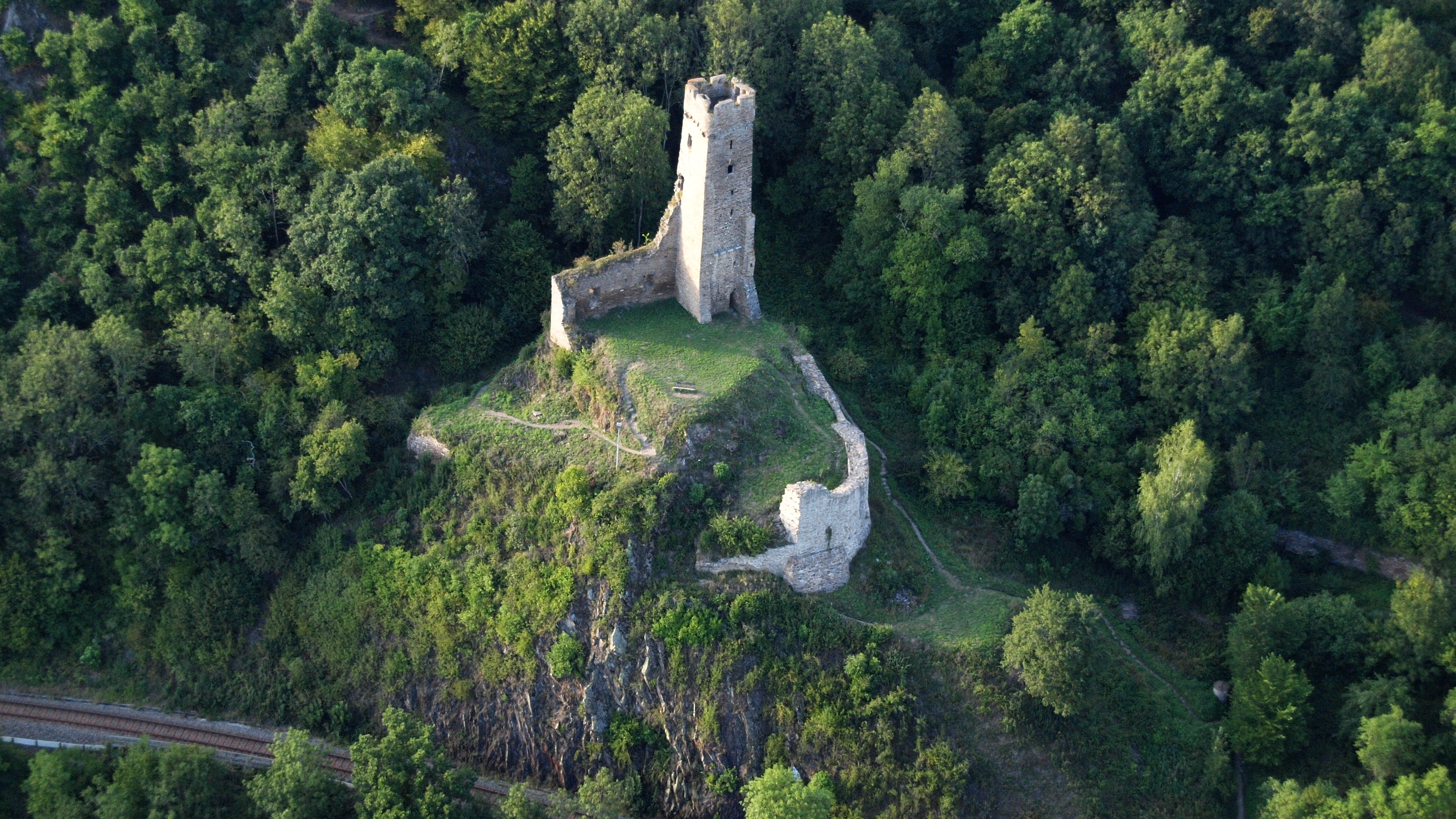
The Philippsburg, 2015 aerial photograph

== History ==
The spur castle of Löwenburg was first recorded in 1229. Its builder was Count Hermann III of Virneburg, who ironically built it on the territory of his brother, Philip, following a partition agreement. The resulting fraternal feud was subsequently settled later, however, in a legal treaty and Philip relinquished his rights over the region to his brother.

The Philippsburg was also built in the 13th century. Its small size, in comparison with the Löwen (lion) gave rise to its local nickname, the Reh (deer). There are two different theories about its existence: one views the Phillipsburg simply as an advanced work or outwork of the Löwenburg; according to local tradition, however, the castle was Philip's answer to the unauthorised construction of the Löwenburg by his brother.

Although Monreal was on the territory of the Electorate of Trier, the counts of Virneburg always enjoyed good relations with the Electorate of Cologne. Their aim was, first and foremost, to secure ecclesial benefices for the numerous descendants of the Virneburg counts. For example, Henry II of Virneburg, born in 1244 or 1246, was initially the cathedral dean in Cologne. In 1306, at the age of about 60, he was elected as Archbishop of Cologne and held the office for 26 years. He had the task of consolidating the Cologne Erzstift in the decades after the Battle of Worringen in 1288 and the subsequent loss of power.

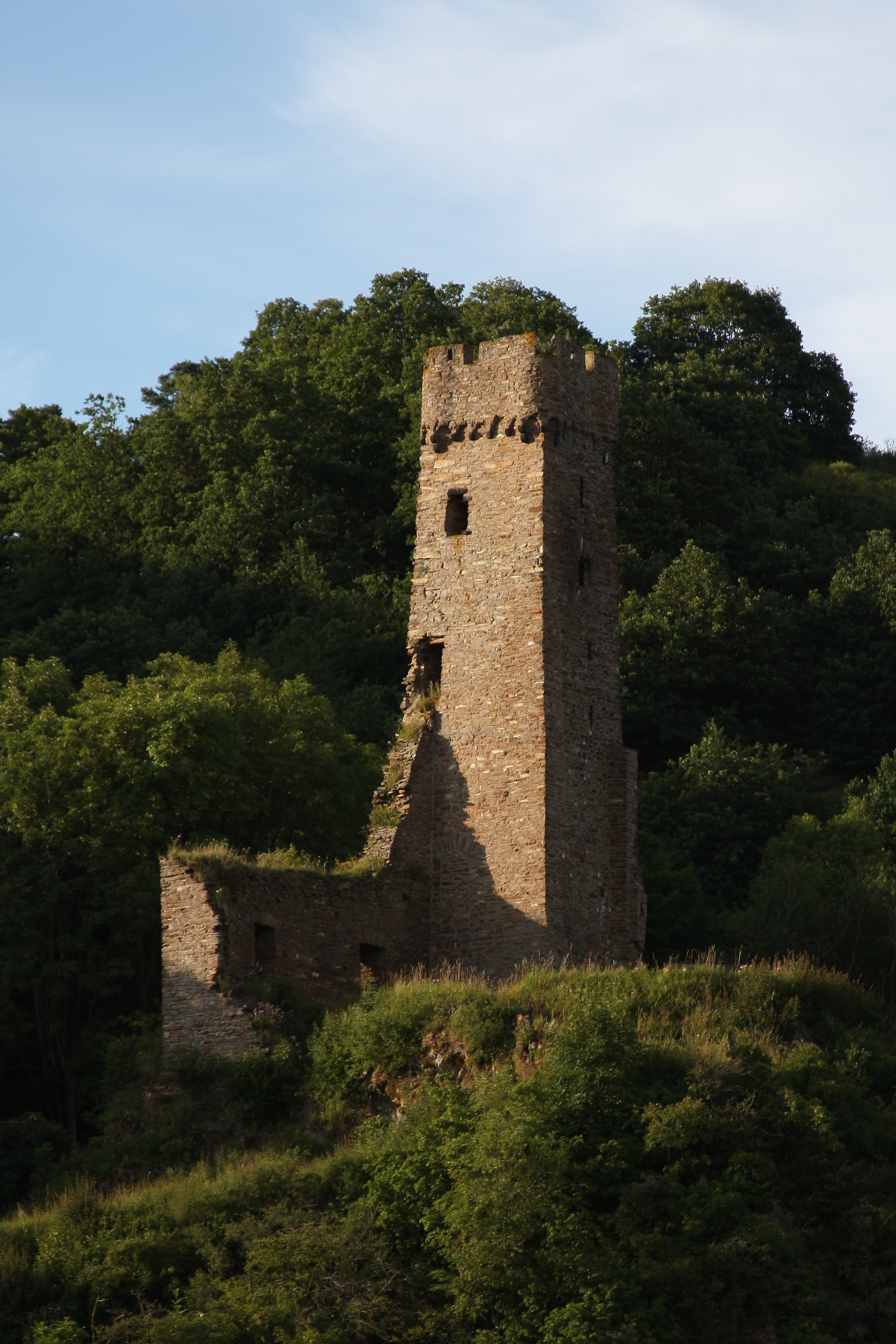
Ruins of the Philippsburg above Monreal

As a result of the close relations of the Virneburgs to Cologne and the fact that Henry II of Virneburg carried out constant attacks on the nearby Electoral Trier town of Mayen, a feud broke out between the Archbishop of Trier and the Virneburgs. At the behest of the Archbishop of Cologne, the two parties reached an agreement to the effect that Henry II would turn the Monreal castle into a fief of Trier after the death of his father, Robert III of Virneburg. This was done. The Virneburgs subsequently acquired ecclesial offices in Trier as well; in the 14th century alone, they provided six members of the cathedral chapter.

Under Robert IV of Virneburg, who was the lord of Monreal between 1384 and 1445, the estate was further developed and the castle was used several times as a dower house of the comital family in the 14th and 15th centuries. At the beginning of the 16th century, Monreal had already replaced the ancestral castle of the count's family in Virneburg.

When the line of the House of Virneburg died out with the death of Count Cuno in 1545, Henry of Leiningen succeeded him as the Lehnsmann or vassal. After 1555, however, the Elector of Trier did not perpetuate the fiefdom, but installed up his own Amtmann.

In 1632, the imposing fortifications suffered heavy damage in a futile attempt to defend the town against Swedish troops and, in 1689, during the War of the Palatine Succession, it was finally destroyed by French troops. In 1815, in the course of secularisation, the ruins were granted to Prussia and remained in their ownership until the state castle administration (today: part of the General Directorate for Cultural Heritage Rhineland-Palatinate) inherited the inner bailey of the castle. From 1970 onwards, they had various safety measures carried out, so that the ruins of the castle can nowadays be freely visited.

== Present condition ==
Large parts of the ruins of the Löwenburg have been preserved, enabling the former appearance of the castle to be imagined. The remains of the 25-metre-high bergfried, with its three-metre-thick walls, are highly visible from a long way off. Its elevated entrance faces the valley, i.e. the side facing away from the enemy. The tower was protected in the 15th century by a pointed shield wall which protected it against the firearms emerging at that time. Today it is accessible as a viewing tower.

The inner bailey of the castle is guarded by two neck ditches: an arched one protects it from the higher hillside to the northwest, another one separates it from the eastern outer bailey, of which only a few remains have survived.

The outer walls of the early Gothic castle chapel were once reinforced by an enceinte. Since its former vaults have collapsed, the remains of this church building are hardly recognizable any more.

Some significant elements of the Philippsburg have also survived, especially its northwest tower and the south wall, which was restored in 2007/2008.

== Literature ==
- Werner Bornheim gen. Schilling (2001), G. Ulrich Großmann (ed.), "Die Burgen von Monreal", Monreal in der Eifel, Berichte zur Haus- und Bauforschung 7 (in German), Marburg, pp. 61–72
- Günther Stanzl: Instandsetzungsarbeiten an der Burgruine Monreal („Große Burg“). Ein kritischer Arbeitsbericht. In: Denkmalpflege in Rheinland-Pfalz. 47/51 (1992/1996), pp. 429–440.
