= Markus Meurer =

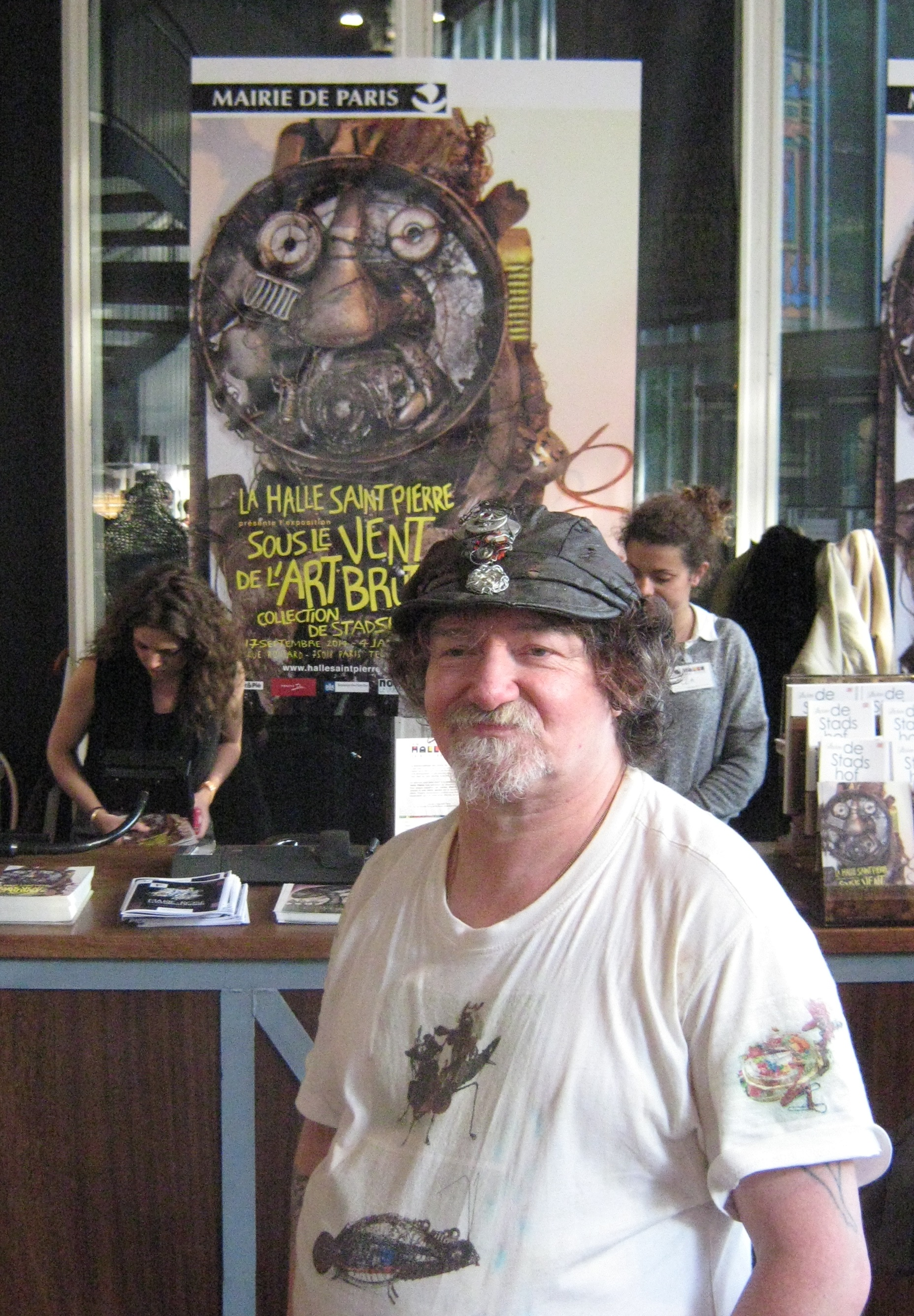
Markus Meurer, Halle Saint Pierre, Paris, France, 2014.

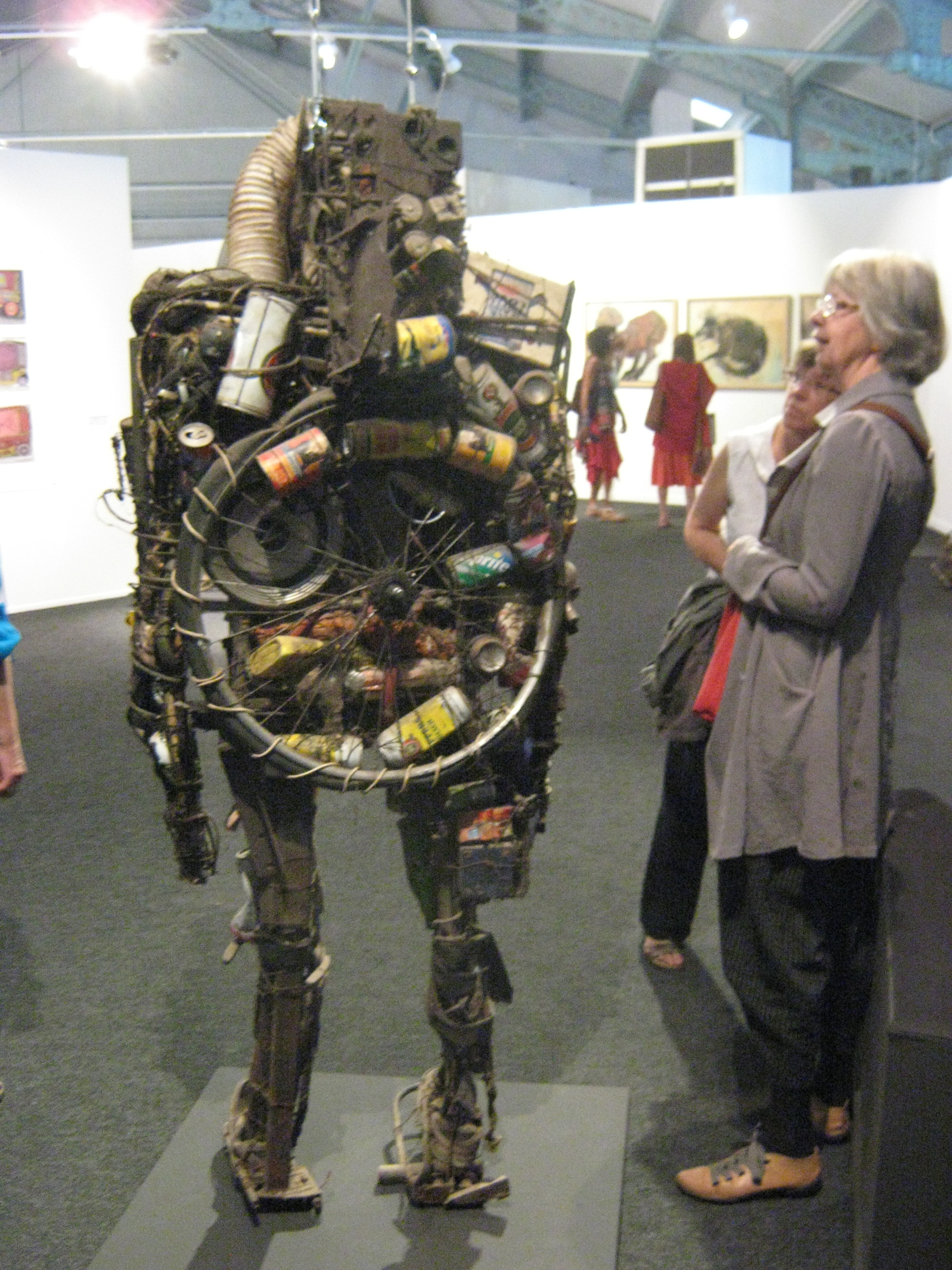
Markus Meurer, Sculpture "Mama" (Back).

Markus Meurer (born 28 April 1959 in Monreal, Germany), is a German outsider artist. He transforms found objects into sculptures and collages.

== Life and work ==
Markus Meurer learned already as a child how to make figures using wire and pliers. His father, who was an Outsider Art artist himself, taught Markus in his early years how to use these tools to make objects. But while the father built items like motorbikes in as realistic a fashion as possible, the son created his pieces with great, free spirit. He connected found objects, things and materials that were normally considered trash, with wire, giving them a new life. He transformed these artifacts into mythic creations, hybrid creatures of animal, man, and machine.

Since he could not support himself with his art, he earned some money with casual jobs, anything that came his way. Up to 2006 he lived in the house of his parents in Monreal, Eifel, Germany. Over the years he turned this house into a Gesamtkunstwerk, a total, comprehensive work of art.

After the death of his parents, life in Monreal became more and more difficult for Meurer. From 2006 to 2008 he lived with his British wife in England. Here he wrote his book Die Plange Angst (Glaring Fear).

With the help of friends Markus and his wife returned to Germany, to Kevelaer on the Lower Rhine, where they now live. His apartment is his home as well as his studio, and also serves as exhibition space. Meanwhile, the house of his parents was declared unsafe and uninhabitable and was torn down by the town of Monreal.

Markus’ work was made known in Germany as well as abroad with the help of art lovers around Kevelaer. These past years his work includes more and more collages that demonstrate his philosophy and unique picture of the world.

== Selected exhibitions ==
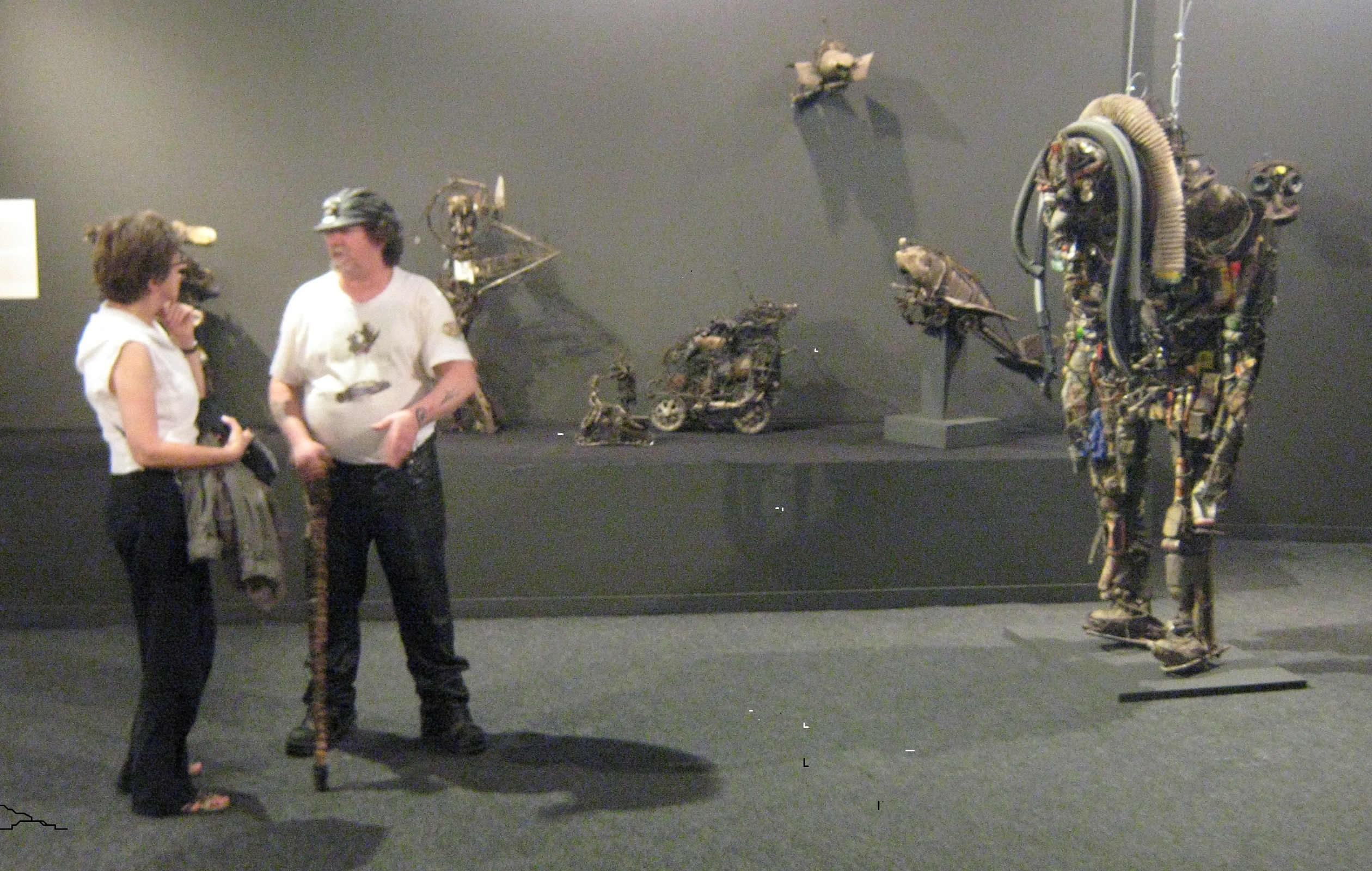
Markus Meurer and visitor in front of his works, Halle Saint-Pierre, Paris, France 2014.

- 1986 Genovevaburg, Mayen, Germany
- 2007 Kunsthaus Kannen, Münster, Germany
- 2008 Haus te Gesselen, Kevelaer, Germany
- 2009 Outsider Art House, Veenhuizen, The Netherlands
- 2009 Verbeeke Foundation, Kemzeke, Belgium
- 2009 Kunsthaus Kannen, Münster, Germany
- 2010 Slovak National Gallery, Bratislava, Slovakia
- 2010 Haus Lawaczeck, Kerken, Germany
- 2010/2011 Galerie Stattmuseum, Düsseldorf, Germany
- 2011 Kunsthaus Kannen, Münster, Germany
- 2012 Creatieve Fabriek, Hengelo, The Netherlands
- 2012 GarageRotterdam, Rotterdam, The Netherlands
- 2013 Kunsthaus Kannen, Münster, Germany
- 2014 CityPalais, Duisburg, Germany
- 2014 Galerie ART CRU, Berlin, Germany
- 2014/2015 Collection De Stadshof, Halle Saint-Pierre, Paris, France
- 2015 Hazemeijer, Hengelo, The Netherlands
- 2015 Kunsthaus Kannen, Münster, Germany
- 2016 Atelier Filip Henin, Düsseldorf, Germany
- 2016 Museum Dr, Guislain, Ghent, Belgium
- 2017 Treibhaus Voll Kunst, Recklinghausen, Germany
- 2017 Museum Dr. Guislain, Ghent, Belgium
- 2017 Kunsthaus Kannen, Münster, Germany
- 2017 Pop-Up Museum, Rotterdam, The Netherlands
- 2018 Galerie Herenplaats, Rotterdam, The Netherlands
- 2018 Galerie ART CRU, Berlin, Germany
- 2018 Hazemeijer, Hengelo, The Netherlands
- 2018 Salle Françis Mitterrand, Rives, France
- 2019 bergérie des arts, Düsseldorf, Germany
- 2019 Galerie de La Tour, Klagenfurt, Austria
- 2021 Museum Wilhelm Morgner, Soest, Germany
- 2022 Kunstraum DenkArt, Recklinghausen, Germany
- 2022 Galerie Haus im Park, Emmerich, Germany
- 2022 Art Brut Biennale, Hengelo, The Netherlands
- 2023 Treibhaus Voll Kunst, Recklinghausen, Germany
- 2023 Kunsthaus Kannen, Münster, Germany
- 2023 Art Brut Biennale, Hengelo, The Netherlands
- 2024 Kunstforum Buddemühle, Welver, Germany
- 2024 Kulturwerkstatt auf AEG, Nuremberg

== Publications, exhibition catalogues ==
- Markus Meurer. Productie Outsider Art House, Veenhuizen 2009.
- Markus Meurer: Die Plange Angst. edition statt-museum, Düsseldorf 2010, ISBN 978-3-00-032833-6.
- Petra Dreier & Michael Hanousek (Ed.), auf pump. 31 künstlerische Positionen, Duisburg 2014
- Alexandra von Gersdorf-Bultmann: SHREK – Markus Meurer. Galerie ART CRU, Berlin 2014.
- Frans Smolders, Liesbeth Reith, Jos ten Berge: Solitary Creations. 51 Artists out of De Stadshof Collection. Eindhoven 2014. ISBN 978-94-6226-047-4.
- Petra Dreier & Michael Hanousek, Ulrich Mohr (Ed.), KunstAcker 144. 35 künstlerische Positionen der Insider- & Outsiderkunst, Düsseldorf 2014
- Frans Smolders: Markus Meurer. In: Sous le vent de l’art brut 2 - Collection De Stadshof, Halle Saint-Pierre, Paris 2014, pp. 84–85.
- Hadwiga und Peter Nieting: Markus Meurer. Geldern 2018.
- Aktion Kunst Stiftung (Ed.), inTime3, Soest 2021, ISBN 978-3-9818570-4-7

== Articles ==
- Lisa Inckmann: Markus Meurer. In: 2 x 2 Forum Outsider Art, Kunsthaus Kannen, Münster 2009, p. 29.
- Frans Smolders: Markus Meurer. In: Insita 2010, Slovak National Gallery, pp. 90–91, Bratislava 2010, ISBN 978-80-8059-150-2.
- Frans Smolders: „Drek bestaat niet“. Alles is materie voor Markus Meurer. In: Out of Art. Magazine voor actuele Outsider Art, Vol. 5, No. 1 / 2010, Amsterdam 2010.
- Markus Meurer, Fielosofie der Ängste und Die Angst. Wo kommt sie her. In: Lisa Inckmann (Ed.): gedankenschwer und federleicht, Münster 2010, pp. 92–93, 154-155, ISBN 3-930330-19-9.
- Jasmijn Jarram: Markus Meurer. In: Catalogue Border Lines, garagerotterdam.nl/en/catalogues/3/artist/23/ [2012]. Retrieved October 1, 2012
- Angelika Hille-Sandvoß: Einführung. In: Petra Dreyer und Michael Hanousek (Ed.): auf pump. 31 künstlerische Positionen. Duisburg 2014, p. 8; pp. 50–51.
- Henk van Es: Künstlerhaus in Monreal. In: outsider-envirements.blogspot.de. January 3, 2012. Retrieved January 4, 2012.
- Frans Smolders: Markus Meurer. In: Frans Smolders, Liesbeth Reith, Jos ten Berge (Ed.): Solitary Creations. 51 Artists out of De Stadshof Collection. Eindhoven 2014, pp. 188–195, ISBN 978-94-6226-047-4
- Christiane Meixner: Shreklich. In: Der Tagesspiegel (Berlin). May 17, 2014. Retrieved May 17, 2014
