= Kevelaer =

- Town
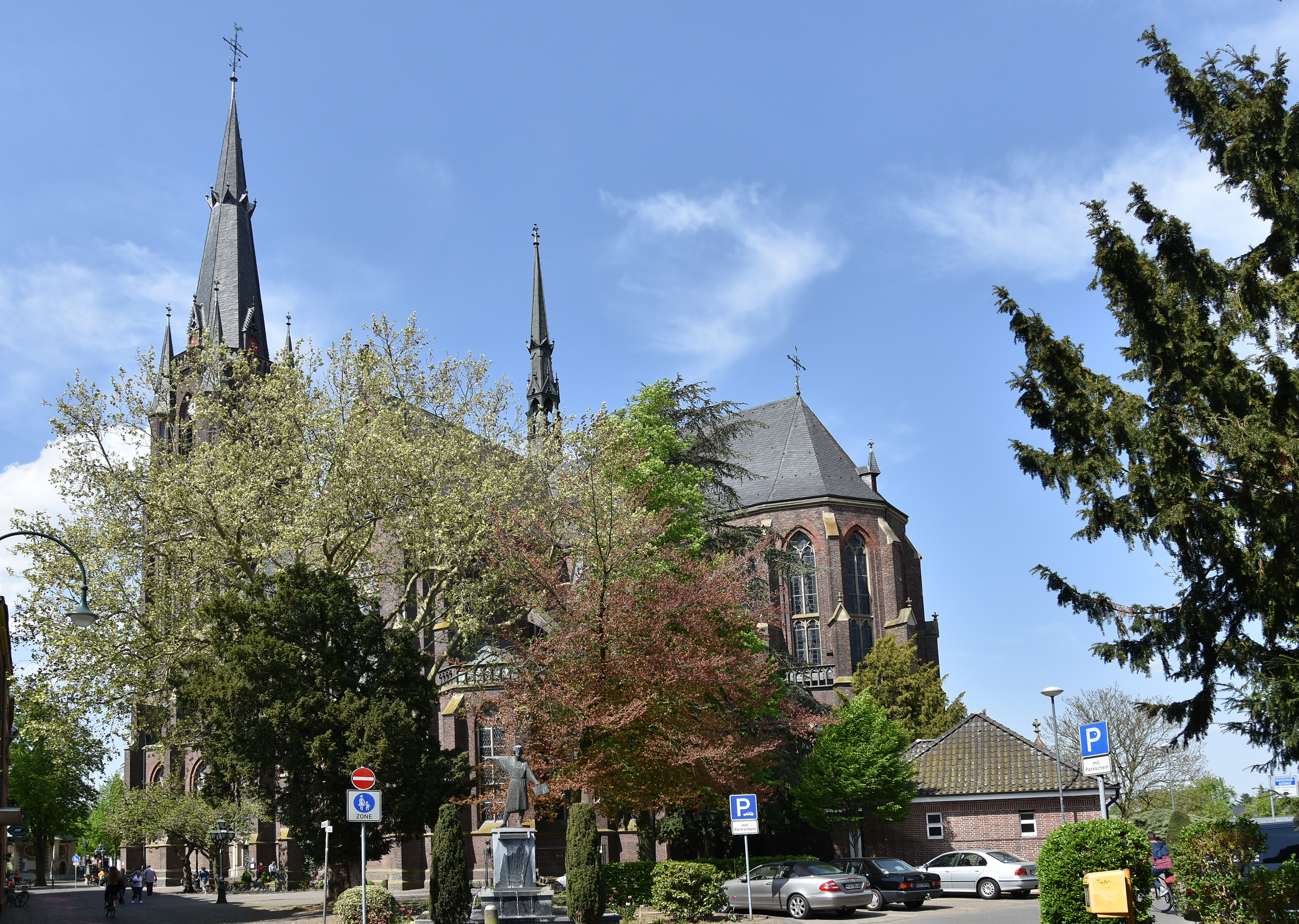
- The Basilica of Our Lady of Consolation

- Flag Coat of arms

- Location of Kevelaer within Kleve district
- Interactive map of Kevelaer
- Location within Germany Location within North Rhine-Westphalia
- Coordinates: 51°35′N 06°15′E
- Country: Germany
- State: North Rhine-Westphalia
- Admin. region: Düsseldorf
- District: Kleve
- Subdivisions: 5

Government
  - Mayor (2020–25): Dominik Pichler (Ind.)

Area
  - Total: 100.64 km^{2} (38.86 sq mi)
- Elevation: 20 m (66 ft)

Population (2025-12-31)
  - Total: 28,215
  - Density: 280.36/km^{2} (726.12/sq mi)
- Time zone: UTC+01:00 (CET)
  - Summer (DST): UTC+02:00 (CEST)
- Postal codes: 47623, 47624, 47625, 47626, 47627
- Dialling codes: 0 28 32
- Vehicle registration: KLE, GEL
- Website: www.kevelaer.de

Kevelaer (German pronunciation: [ˈkeːvəlaːɐ̯]; Low Rhenish: Käwela) is a town in the district of Kleve, in North Rhine-Westphalia in Germany. It is the largest Catholic pilgrimage location within north-western Europe. Over one million Marian devotees, mostly from Germany and the Netherlands, visit the Basilica of Kevelaer every year to honour the Blessed Virgin Mary. The population in 2025 was 28,215.

== Marian cult and Legend ==
Historical affiliations

County of Guelders 1300–1339
Duchy of Guelders 1339–1393
Duchy of Jülich 1393–1423
Duchy of Guelders 1423–1543
Habsburg Netherlands 1543–1556
Spanish Netherlands 1556–1713
Kingdom of Prussia 1713–1794
French Republic 1794–1804
French Empire 1804–1814
Kingdom of Prussia 1815–1871
German Empire 1871–1918
Weimar Republic 1919–1933
Nazi Germany 1933–1945
Allied-occupied Germany 1945–1949
West Germany 1949–1990
Germany 1990–present

Kevelaer is a center of veneration and pilgrimage to Our Lady of Consolation. According to tradition, a merchant named Hendrik Busman, in the days before Christmas, 1641, three times heard a voice saying "Here thou shalt build me a chapel". He began to set money aside but feared his wife, Mechel, wouldn't approve. She, however, had a vision, around Pentecost, in which she saw a little chapel containing a print of Our Lady of Consolation, all bathed in light. The story was confirmed by two passing soldiers, who saw the house light up at night. Days before, two soldiers had tried to sell her two copperplate engravings with the same image on it, but she found it too expensive. Hendrik began building the chapel while Mechel tried to obtain the print.

== History ==
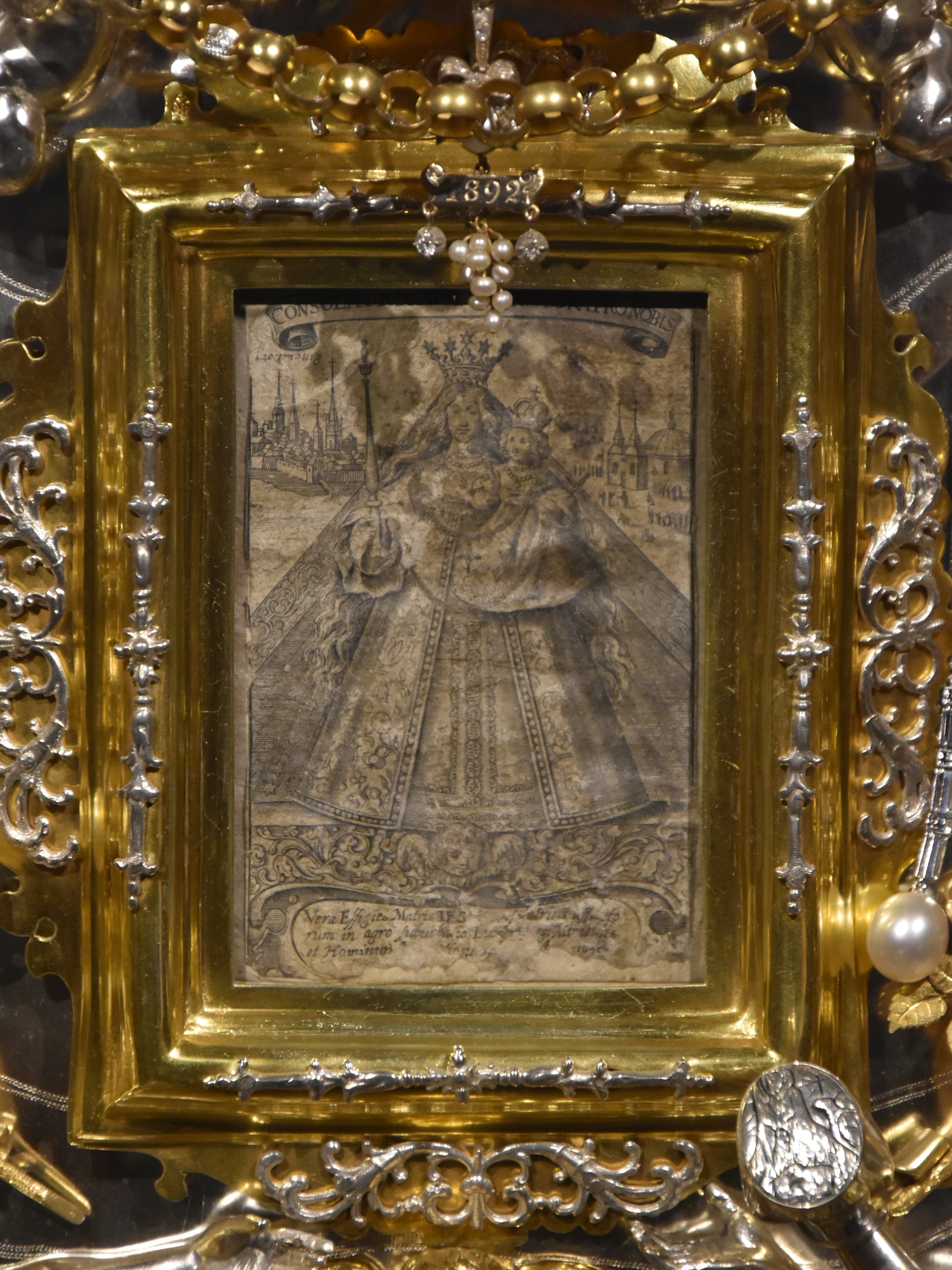
Our Lady of Kevelaer wearing her marked golden Pontifical crown from 1 June 1892.

The chapel was consecrated and on 1 June 1642, the Sunday after Assumption of Mary, the print was displayed in it, and the chapel became such a popular destination for pilgrims that a church was built for them between 1643 and 1645. The little chapel was replaced in 1654 with a larger one, the Gnadenkapelle, which still houses the print.

It is one of the most visited Catholic pilgrimage sites in north-western Europe. The Gnadenkapelle (English: Chapel of Mercy) has drawn pilgrims to the Lower Rhine Region from all over the world for more than 360 years.

== Pontifical approbations ==
Pope Leo XIII issued a Pontifical decree of coronation towards the venerated Marian image on 20 July 1890. The rite of coronation was executed on 1 June 1892.

Pope Pius XI issued a Pontifical decree In Civitate Appellata which raised her shrine to the status of Minor Basilica on 23 April 1923, signed and notarized by the Vatican Secretary of State, Cardinal Pietro Gasparri.

Pope John Paul II visited the basilica in 2 May 1987.

== Population ==
Historical population

Year	Pop.	±% p.a.
1965	19,868	—
1970	20,555	+0.68%
1975	20,969	+0.40%
1980	21,611	+0.60%
1985	22,242	+0.58%
1990	23,309	+0.94%
1995	25,737	+2.00%

Year	Pop.	±% p.a.
2000	27,060	+1.01%
2005	27,867	+0.59%
2010	28,328	+0.33%
2015	28,311	−0.01%
2020	27,955	−0.25%
2025	28,215	+0.19%

Source: Landesdatabank Nordrhein-Westfalen

== References in literature ==
Kevelaer is the setting of the 1822 ballad Die Wallfahrt nach Kevlaar (The Kevelaer Pilgrimage) by the German poet Heinrich Heine.

== Twin towns – sister cities ==
Kevelaer is twinned with:

- Bury St Edmunds, England, United Kingdom

== Notable people ==
- Franz-Peter Tebartz-van Elst (born 1959), prelate of the Catholic Church and theologian
- Markus Meurer (born 1959), outsider artist

== Gallery ==
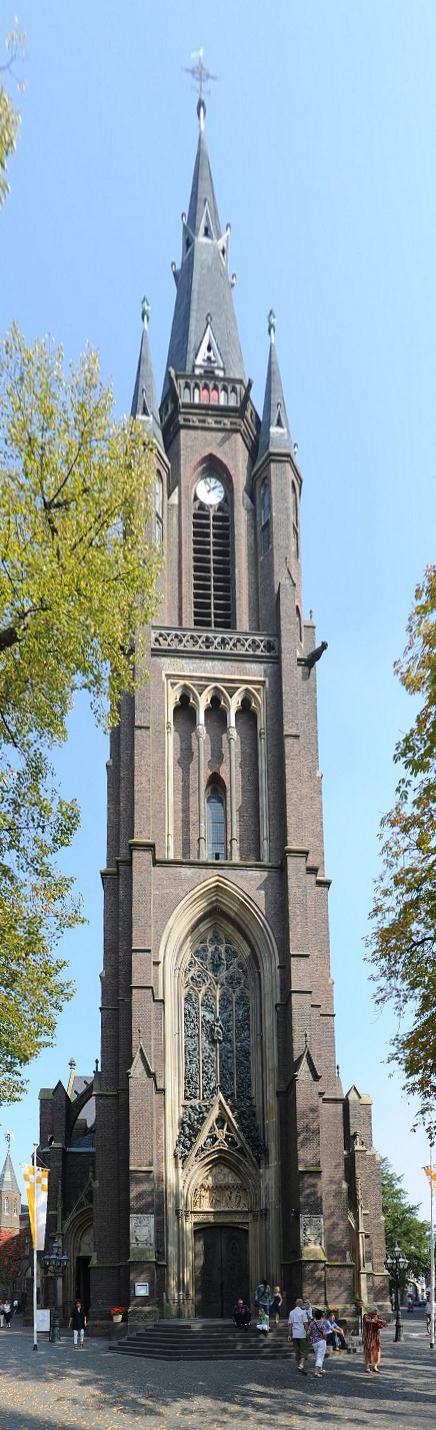
Basilica

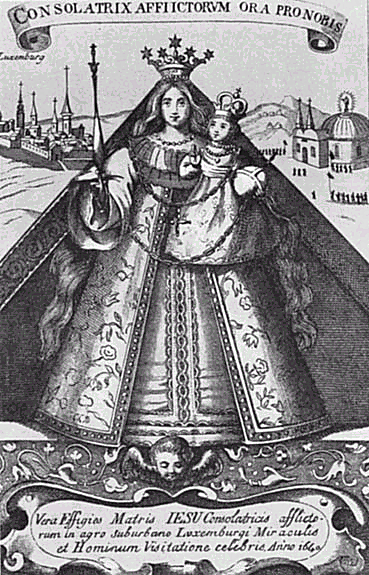
Kevelaerer picture of Grace

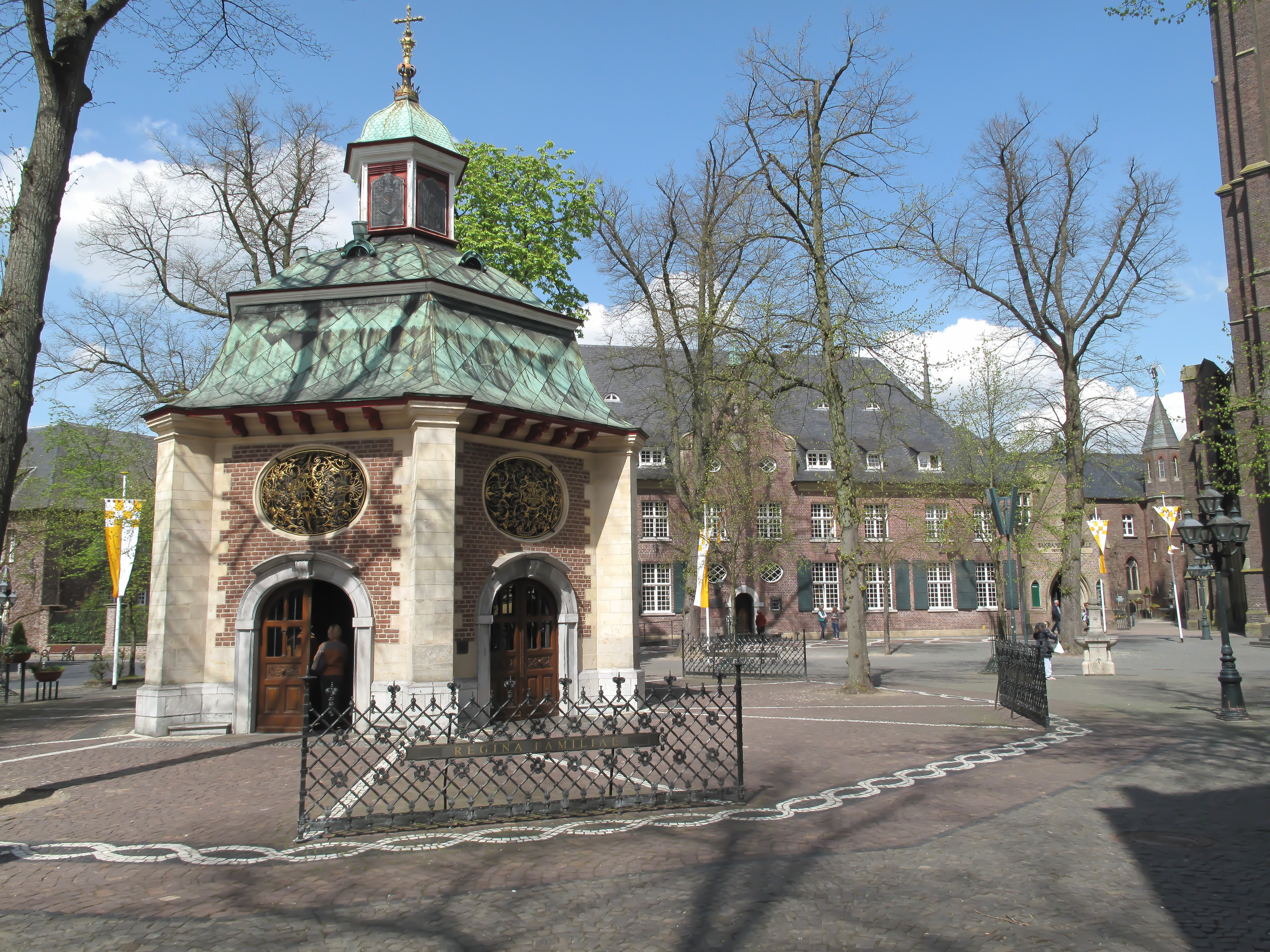
Chapel

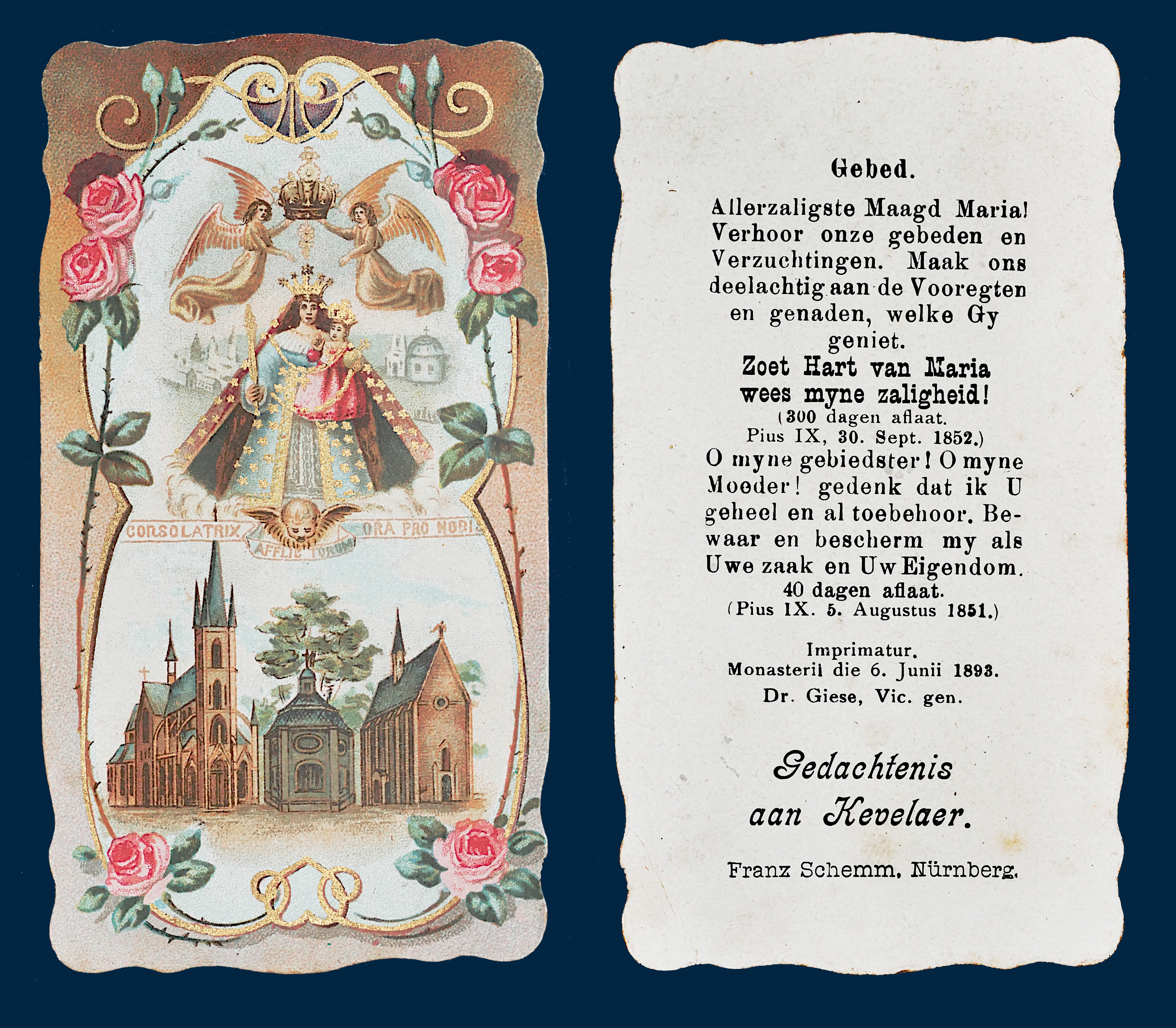
A historical Catholic devotional card
