= Monreal, Germany =

Monreal
- Municipality
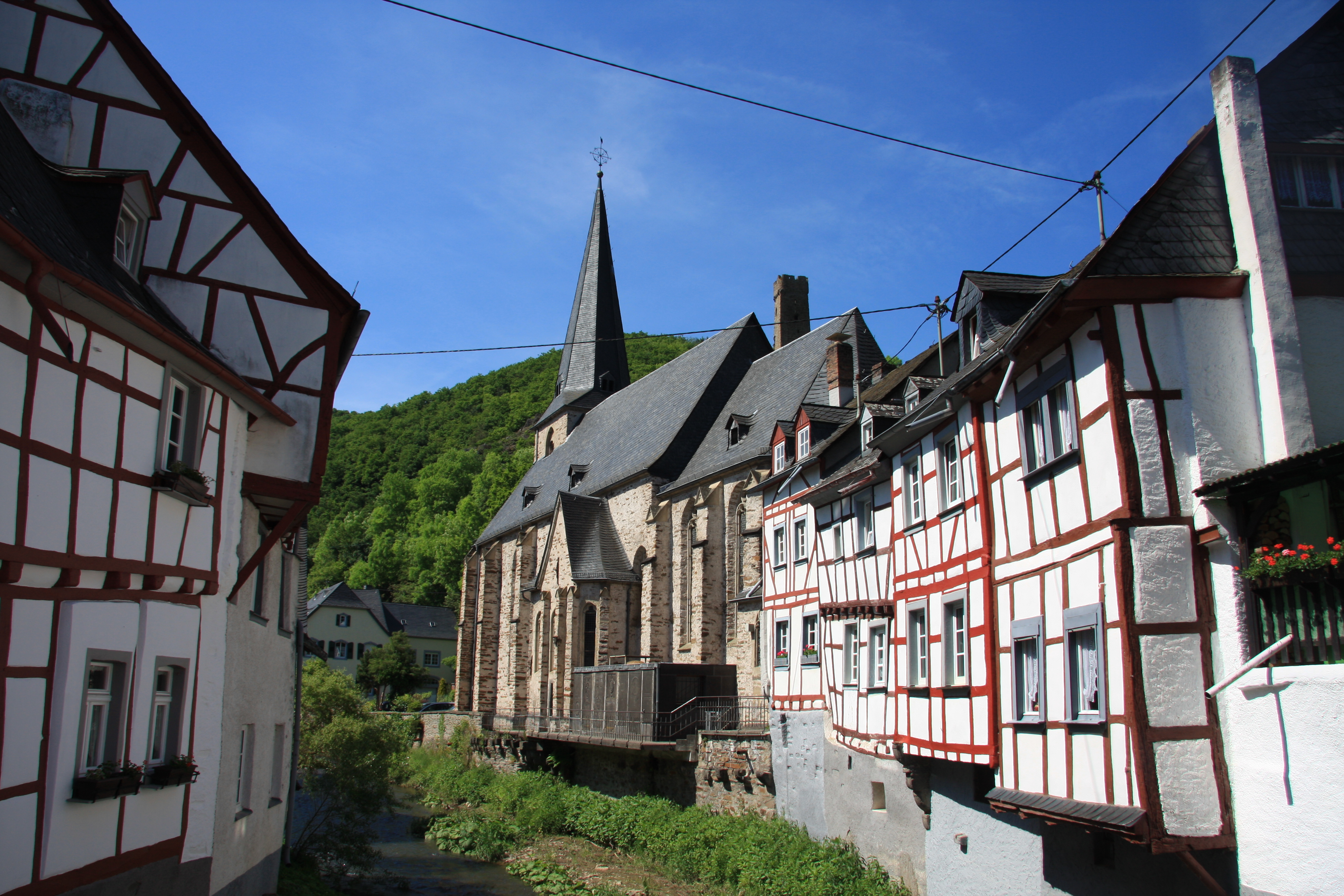
- The Parish in Monreal, along the Eltzbach

- Coat of arms

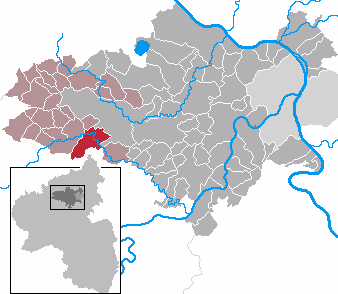
- Location of Monreal within Mayen-Koblenz district
- Interactive map of Monreal
- Location within Germany Location within Rhineland-Palatinate
- Coordinates: 50°18′0″N 7°9′34″E
- Country: Germany
- State: Rhineland-Palatinate
- District: Mayen-Koblenz
- Municipal assoc.: Vordereifel

Government
  - Mayor (2019–24): André Übener

Area
  - Total: 14.65 km^{2} (5.66 sq mi)
- Elevation: 300 m (980 ft)

Population (2025-12-31)
  - Total: 733
  - Density: 50.0/km^{2} (130/sq mi)
- Time zone: UTC+01:00 (CET)
  - Summer (DST): UTC+02:00 (CEST)
- Postal codes: 56729
- Dialling codes: 02651
- Vehicle registration: MYK
- Website: www.monreal-eifel.de

Monreal (German pronunciation: [mɔnʁeˈaːl]), Königsberg until the 13th century, is a municipality in the district of Mayen-Koblenz in Rhineland-Palatinate, Germany.

Above the village are the ruined castles of Löwenburg and Philippsburg.

== Notable people ==
- Markus Meurer (born 1959), German outsider artist

== Transport ==
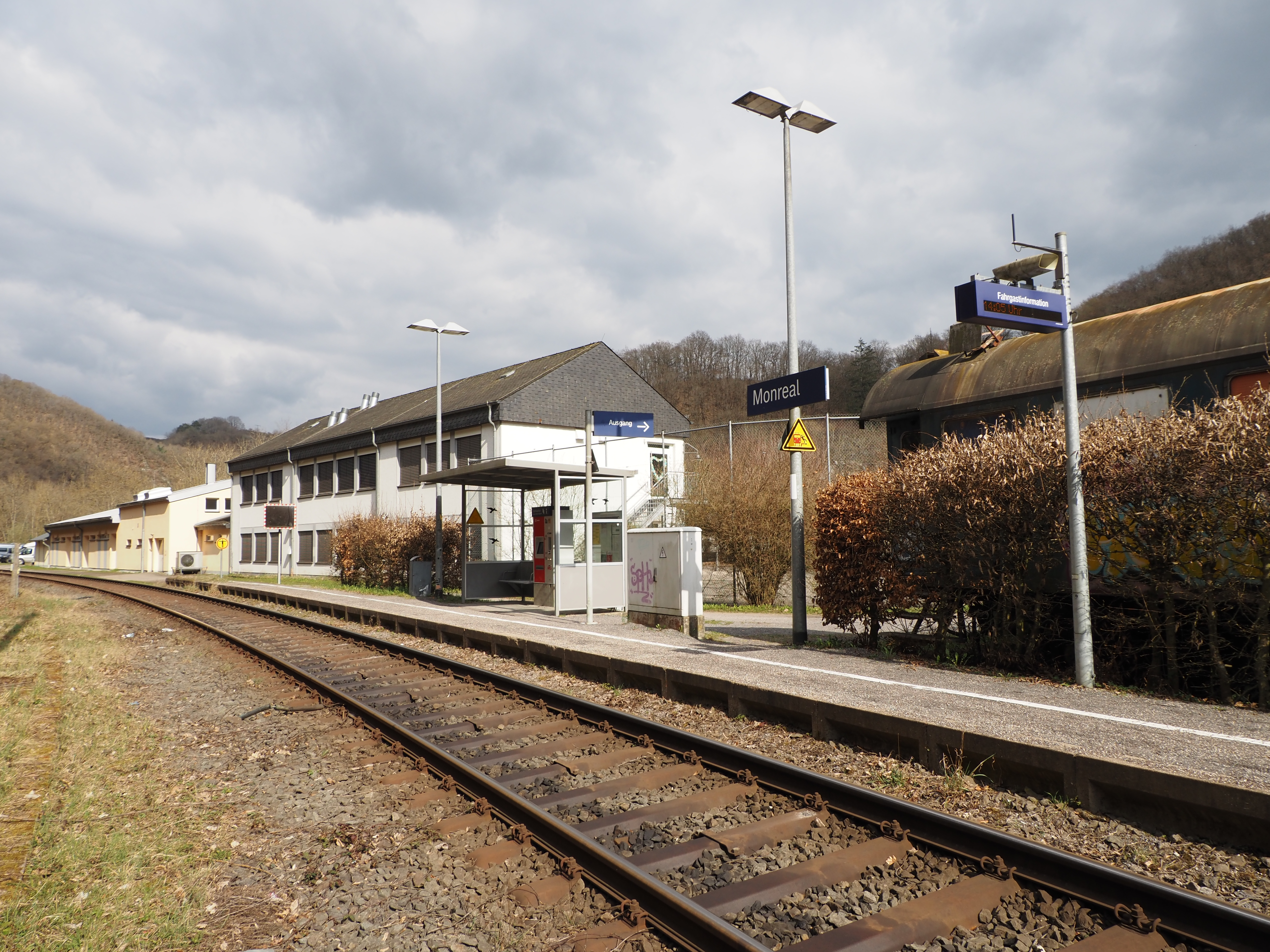
Monreal stop

Monreal train stop, which is located at Cross Eifel Railway, is served by line RB38 (Andernach – Mayen – Kaisersesch) by Lahn-Eifel-Bahn, a part of the Deutsche Bahn. Monreal is located in the area of the transport association Verkehrsverbund Rhein-Mosel (VRM), in the fare zone number 413.
