= Counter-castle =

Type of castle near enemy territory

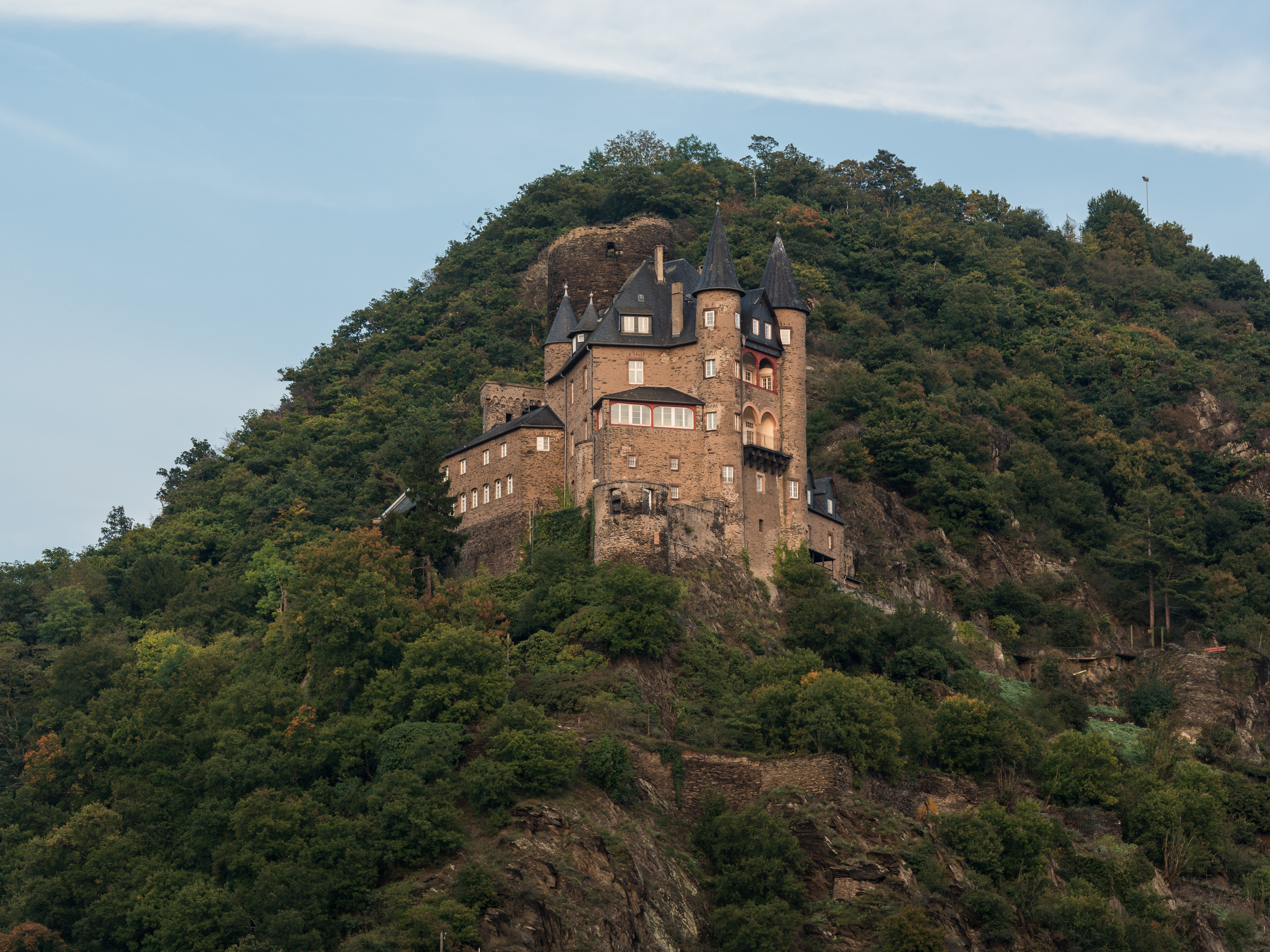
The counter-castle of Katz

Counter-castles were built in the Middle Ages to counter the power of a hostile neighbour or as a siege castle, that is, a fortified base from which attacks could be launched on a nearby enemy castle.

== Purpose ==
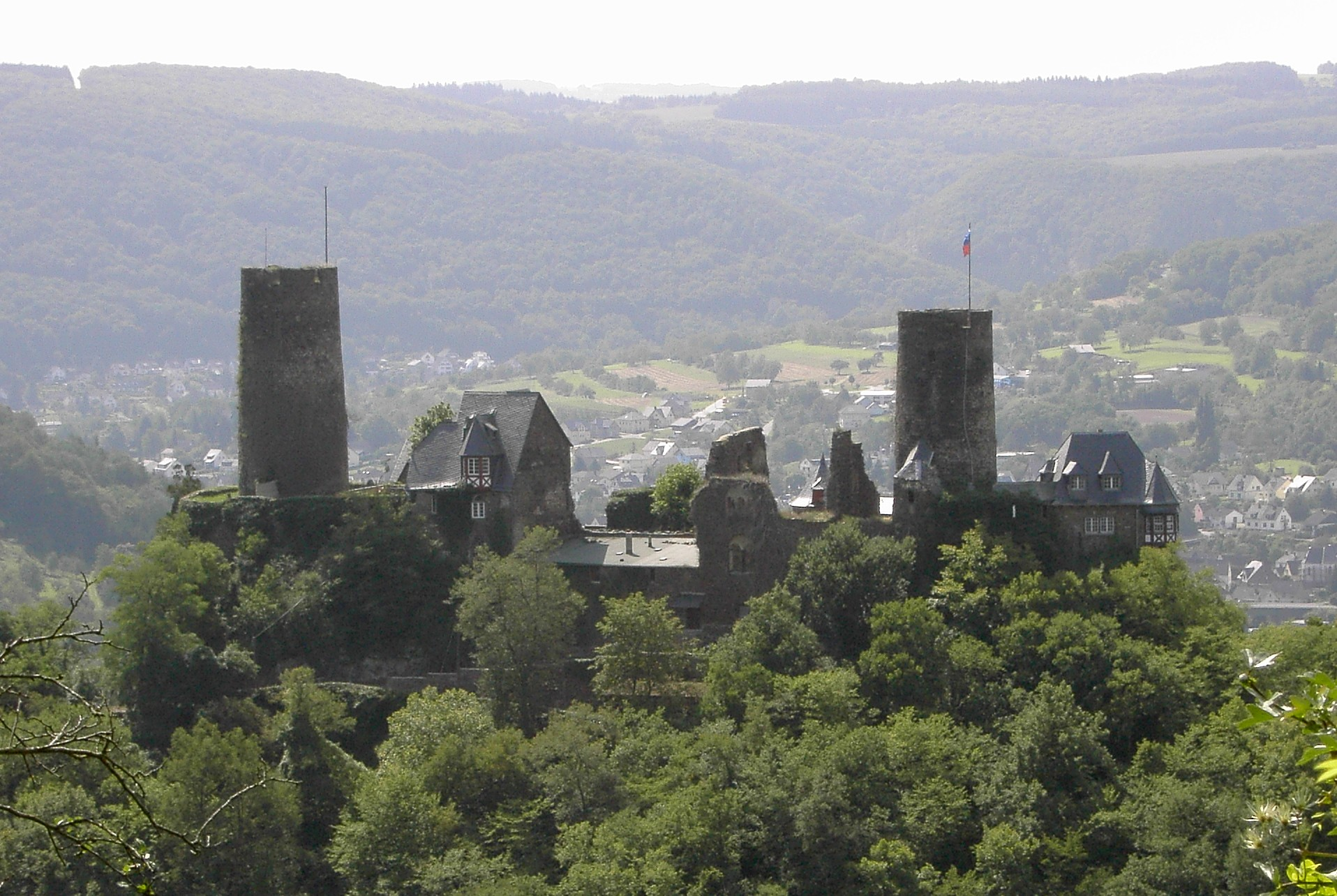
View of Thurant Castle on the Moselle from the Bleidenberg hill

In castle science, and according to medieval usage, a counter-castle was a type of castle that was built to secure a territorial lord's claims to power or to besiege and conquer the estates of rival rulers. In such cases, it may also be referred to as a siege castle. These terms are not used uniformly by specialist authors. Usually a distinction is made between counter-castles and siege castles. Where this is the case, a siege castle refers to one built near the enemy castle within the range of trebuchets and catapults that could act as a strongpoint, a route barrier, a refuge in the event of counter-attacks, a barracks and a battery position for ballistic weapons.

A counter-castle is often used to describe a castle that was built at a greater distance from enemy fortifications and castles. It did not support the immediate siege of a castle, but was constructed as a base in an area of rival power in order to prevent enemy attempts to expand their influence and control.

Siege castles are only evident from the period of the Late Middle Ages onwards. They were usually built as a temporary fortifications using wood and earth above the castle to be captured and within sight and the range of their guns. From this location the target would be bombarded.

Sometimes only a trebuchet position was established instead of a masonry or wooden siege castle. A favourable point in the terrain, within range of the besieged castle, was levelled and lightly fortified. From this position, the enemy castle could be engaged relatively safely with a trebuchet or catapult and its occupants psychologically ground down. Such a position may be seen today about 430 metres northeast and above Thurant Castle on the Moselle.

Trebuchets were used in sieges from the early 13th century. Large catapults had a range of about 400 to 500 metres. However, only wealthy feudal lords could finance the use of such a large, costly siege engine or even the construction of a counter-castle.

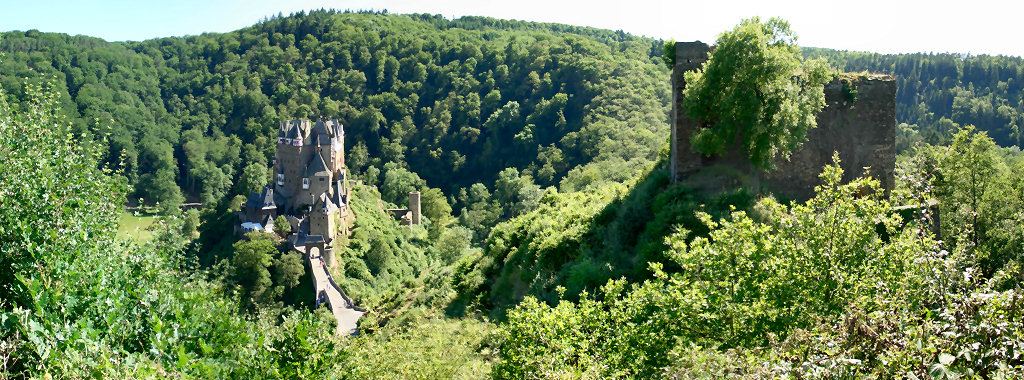
Eltz and Trutzeltz castles

Only occasionally did the attackers have the time and financial resources to build their fortress of stone. Rare examples are Ramstein Castle, the Rauschenburg at Mermuth in the Hunsrück and Trutzeltz Castle. The last-named was built during the Eltz Feud as a counter-castle to Eltz. The Rauschenburg was also built in connection with the Eltz Feud as counter castle to the castles of Ehrenburg, Waldeck and Schöneck.

In the majority of known cases, siege castles were abandoned after the fighting and fell into disrepair. Sometimes the lord of the formerly besieged castle was given the counter-castle in a peace agreement or even took it over as a fief, as in the case of Trutzeltz Castle. In exceptional cases, such structures were - when the conquest was successful - expanded into independent castles. Examples include the Hohenfels and Schadeck Castle at Runkel on the Lahn.

The few surviving stone counter or siege castles generally show evidence of less careful construction. In order to build the fortification quickly, clay was mixed with the lime mortar. These defences are therefore dangerous today in view of their condition and can be made safe through painstaking renovation.

Academic research has only investigated counter and siege castles to any great extent since the end of the 20th century. After scholars like Joachim Zeune had concerned themselves in the 1980s and 1990s more with the symbolism of medieval fortifications, subsequent research began to be more critical of the then established theses. As part of the new focus on the functional and military aspects of military architecture, the counter castle became more of a focus of military historical interest.

== Siege and counter-castles in the Holy Land ==
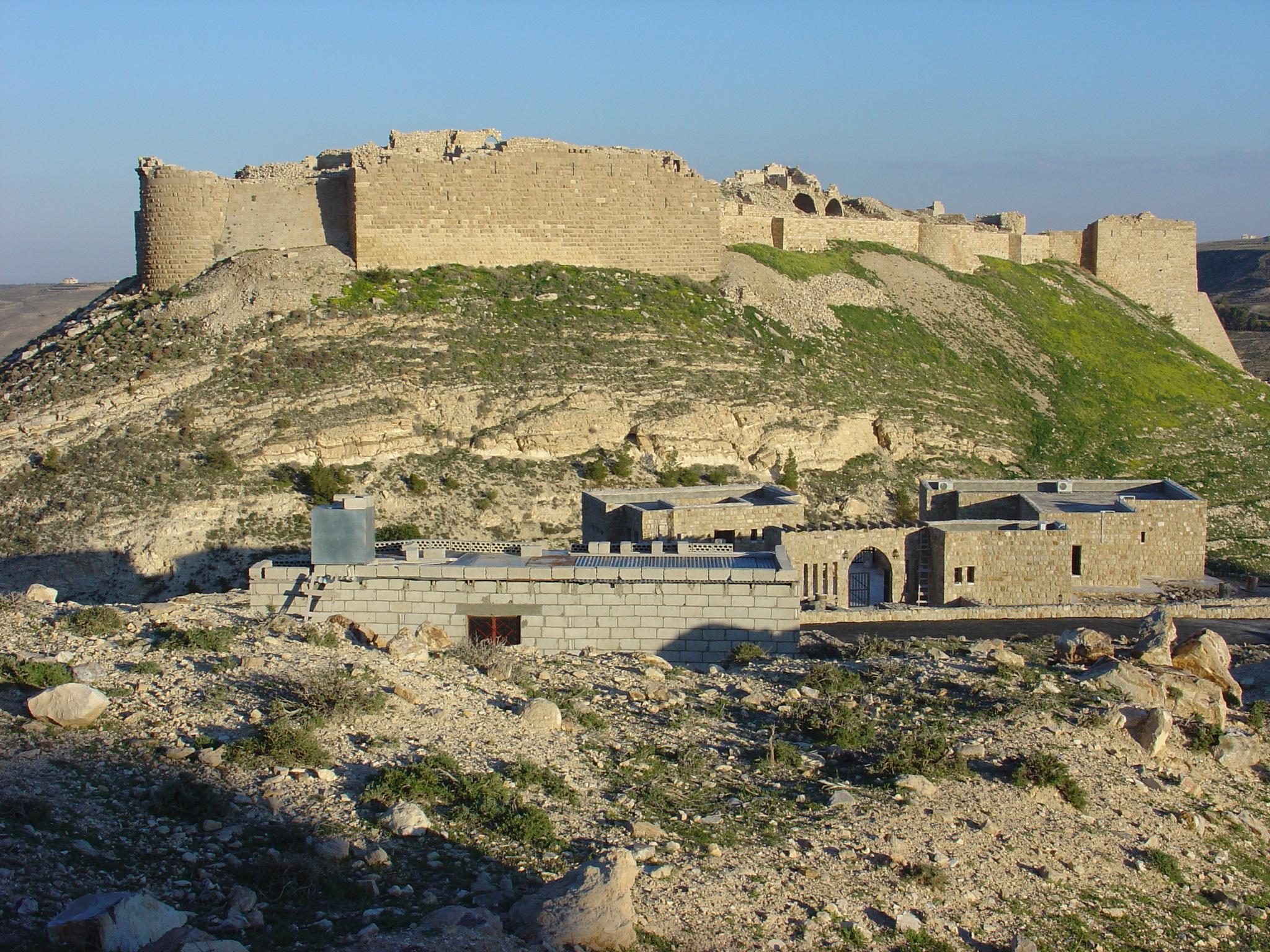
Montreal Castle, Jordan

During the siege of larger, fortified cities and towns castles were sometimes built as protection against sallies and relief troops.

During the First Crusade the Crusaders built the first siege castles before the gates of Islamic towns and cities in the Holy Land. In 1097 Malregard Castle was built in front of the St. Paul's Gate at Antioch. A little later in spring 1098 the castles of La Mahomerie and Tancred's Castle were built in front of the other gateways.

In 1102 Raymond IV of Toulouse ordered the construction of the siege castle, Mons Peregrinus, at Tripoli. Raymond was the Count of St. Gilles, which is why the castle in the centre of the town is known locally as Qal'at Sandjil.

As well as siege castles, counter-castles were also built at greater distance from the besieged towns. For example, in 1117, King Baldwin I built a counter-castle "ad coercendum praedictam urbem" (to conquer the aforementioned town) of Tyre called Scandalion. Despite this siege Tyre did not fall until 1124.

The king also attempted to monitor the important caravan route of Darb al-Hadj from several new castles. Here the Pilgrim's Way ran to Mecca and Medina. Around Petra the castles of Montreal/Shobaq (1115) and Li Vaux Moise were built and, in 1116, fortified strongpoints were added at Aqaba and on the Isle de Graye/Jazirat Fara’un.

In 1142, construction started on the mighty fortress of Kerak (Krak de Moab) in northern Transjordan, to which a harbour on the Dead Sea belonged. From here Raynald of Châtillon undertook numerous raids in the surrounding area. In retaliation, Sultan Saladin attacked the Frankish crusader states.

Between 1133 and 1142 four strong castles (Castrum Arnaldi, Beth Gibelin, Ibelin and Blanchegarde) were built around the Fatimid city of Ashkelon.

== Counter-castles in Japan ==
Construction of several counter-castles during sieges are attributed to Daimyō Oda Nobunaga and to his retainer Toyotomi Hideyoshi, during the wars to consolidate rule over Japan. They constructed "facing forts" (mukai-jo) from which attacks were carried out, and "annex forts" (tsuke-jiro), to physically wrest control of the surrounding land. Hideyoshi is credited with several fortifications which were also meant to strike awe and fear, such as Ishigakiyama Ichiya Castle built to pressure the enemy during the siege of Odawara in 1590, and the Sunomata Castle built in secret over several days during the siege of Inabayama Castle in 1567, but revealed to others only on the final day, seemingly being built in one night. During the siege of Miki Castle in 1578–1580, Hideyoshi ordered the construction of tsuke-jiro to blockade all supply routes and starve the defenders.

== German terminology ==
In the Holy Roman Empire, the term Trutzburg was commonly used to describe the defensive character of a castle that defied all attacks. The word is also used in German as a metaphor for things that are especially durable and resistant.

Where the Trutzburg was built specifically with the object of besieging enemy fortifications it was also known as a Gegenburg ("counter castle"), Okkupationsburg ("occupation castle") or Belagerungsburg ("siege castle"). These terms are used today by modern castle scientists and researchers in preference to the more generic Trutzburg.

== See also ==
- Coercion castle
- Schanze
- Sconce (fortification)

== Literature ==
- Horst Wolfgang Böhme, Reinhard Friedrich, Barbara Schock-Werner (Hrsg.): Wörterbuch der Burgen, Schlösser und Festungen. Reclam, Stuttgart, 2004, ISBN 3-15-010547-1.
- Daniel Burger: Burgen der Kreuzfahrer im Heiligen Land. In: Hans-Jürgen Kotzur (ed.): Die Kreuzzüge - Kein Krieg ist heilig. Mainz, 2004, ISBN 3-8053-3240-8.
- Georg Ulrich Großmann: Burgen in Europa. Regensburg, 2005, ISBN 3-7954-1686-8.
- Michael Losse: Kleine Burgenkunde. Regionalia, Euskirchen, 2011, ISBN 978-3-939722-39-7.
- Olaf Wagener (ed.): … wurfen hin in steine - grôze und niht kleine … Belagerungen und Belagerungsanlagen im Mittelalter. Frankfurt am Main, 2006, ISBN 3-631-55467-2.
- Joachim Zeune: Okkupationsburgen. In: Horst Wolfgang Böhme, Busso von der Dollen (et al., eds.): Burgen in Mitteleuropa, Band II - Geschichte und Burgenlandschaften. Stuttgart, 1999, ISBN 3-8062-1355-0, pp. 79–81.
