= Trutzeltz Castle =

Castle in Germany

- Burg Trutzeltz, Balduineltz, Baldeneltz, Neueltz
- Wierschem
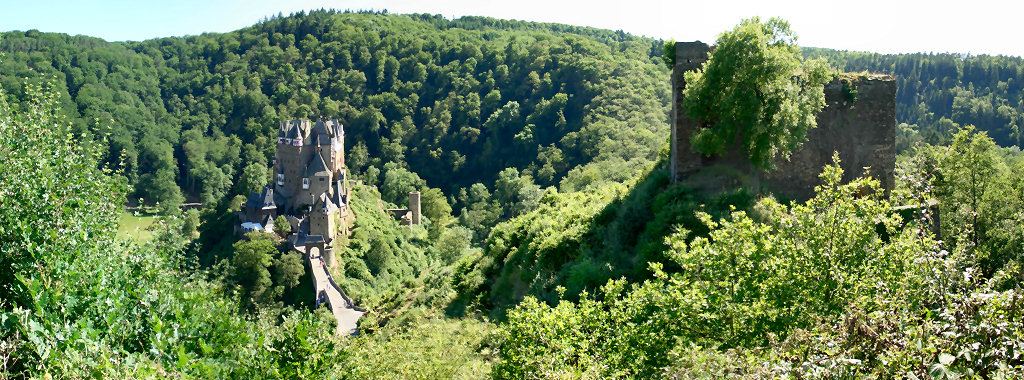
- Eltz (l) and Trutzeltz (r) castles

Site information
- Type: hill castle
- Code: DE-RP
- Condition: Ruins, tower remains, foundation walls

Location
- Coordinates: 50°12′25″N 7°20′11″E
- Height: 360 m above sea level (NN)

Site history
- Built: 1331

Garrison information
- Occupants: clergy

The ruins of Trutzeltz Castle (German: Burg Trutzeltz), also known as Balduineltz, Baldeneltz or Neueltz, are the remains of a hill castle in the valley of the Elz in the parish of Wierschem near the town of Münstermaifeld. It was built as a counter-castle during the medieval Eltz Feud in the Moselle region.

== Geography ==
Trutzeltz stands just 230; meters north of Eltz Castle and 40; meters higher at an elevation of 360 m above sea level (NN) on the rising hillslopes. The very small castle site measures just 30 × 25 meters. The ruins consist mainly of the still over 10 meter-high remains of the tower house and other foundation walls.

== History ==
The castle was built by the Archbishop of Trier, Baldwin during the Eltz Feud (1331-1336/1337) as a siege castle to invest Eltz Castle. The Eltz Feud arose in connection with Baldwin's territorial policy. During his reign, Baldwin sought to extend the influence of Trier along the Moselle. He repeatedly came up against resistance from knights who had refused to recognize their vassal (tenant) status, and 21 of them - the lords of Eltz, Waldeck, Schoneck, and Ehrenberg - agreed on a formal defensive alliance. Baldwin attempted a direct assault on Eltz which failed. In response, he had the siege castle of Trutzeltz built, probably in 1331. The castle was also referred to as Baldeneltz, probably after the archbishop. The following year he also erected the Rauschenburg as a counter castle to the three other castles allied with Eltz. That Baldeneltz was probably built in a very short time to put the lords of Eltz under pressure, can be seen inter alia from the building material used: mostly small pieces of broken stone from the vicinity of the siege castle itself. It was held together with a strong clay mortar, which however cannot withstand a Central European climate in the long run. For a siege castle, this was not important, but it is remarkable in that light that the continued existence of the castle was contractually assured in a subsequent peace treaty.

Eltz Castle was bombarded from the siege castle with rock catapults (trebuchets), but was not able to be captured. In the course of the fighting, Baldwin also used an early form of cannon, the pot-de-fer, which has been determined from archaeological finds at Eltz.

The Lord of Eltz and the other warring knights finally had to agree to end hostilities in 1333. The feud was not officially ended, however, until 1336 by an "atonement" treaty (a Sühne). A certain John of Eltz continued the conflict. He had previously fought against Baldwin even before the Eltz Feud in the Kempenich Feud. and was therefore not ready to enter into a peace treaty. Baldwin now displayed his negotiation skills and magnanimity in drawing his opponent onto his side: after Trutzeltz had been effectively "legitimized" by the peace treaty with the other knights and its survival secured by them, he transferred it in 1337 to John of von Eltz as a fief and made him a hereditary burgrave.

On 9 January 1354 King Charles IV enfeoffed Archbishop Baldwin of Trier with Eltz Castle for his loyal service against Emperor Henry VII.

Citation:
"Hitherto the lords of Eltz were vassals of the Empire. On 9 January 1354 King Charles IV, out of recognition for his loyal service against Emperor Henry VII, enfeoffed Archbishop Baldwin of Trier and his successors with the fortress at Eltz near Münstermaifeld together with its estates and all goods that the commoners of Eltz had as fiefs from him and the Empire, so that the commoners of Eltz should have and receive all these goods in future from Trier. At the same time, he said that after the receipt of this enfeoffment from Trier the oath to the Empire is null and void. With that, the enfeoffment terms of Eltz were promised to Trier."

Trutzeltz Castle soon lost its significance, was no longer maintained, and was recorded in 1453 as derelict. In a 1453 deed, Trutzeltz Castle is described as "currently unoccupied and as a result, deserted and run down ".

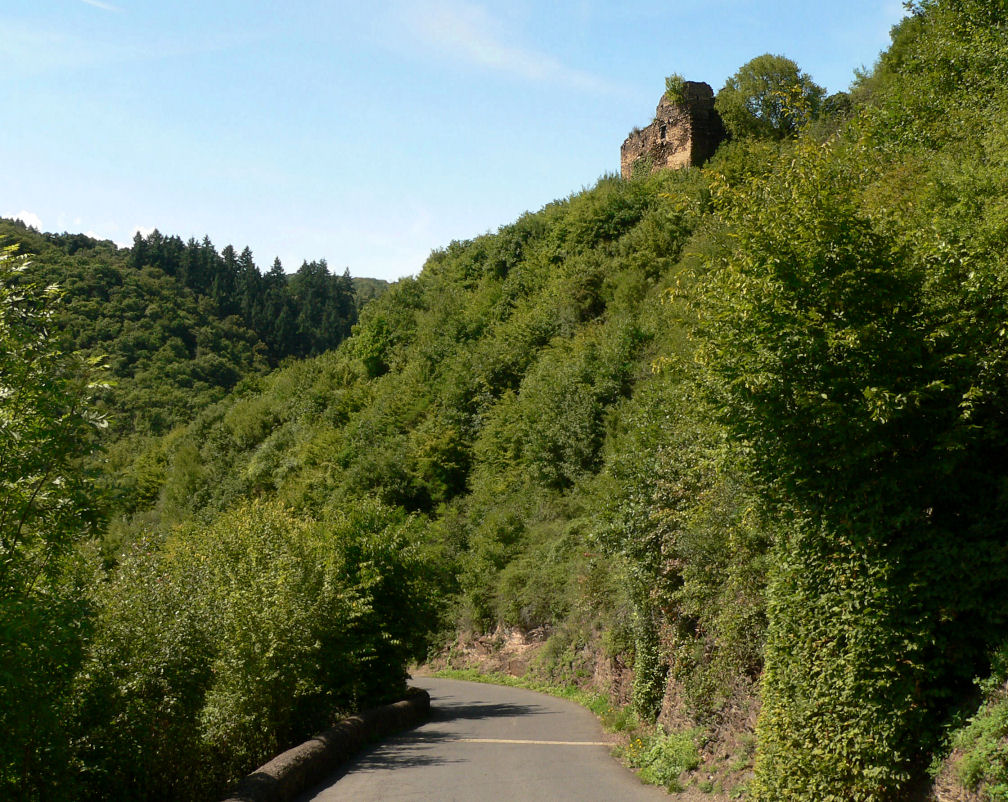
Seen from below

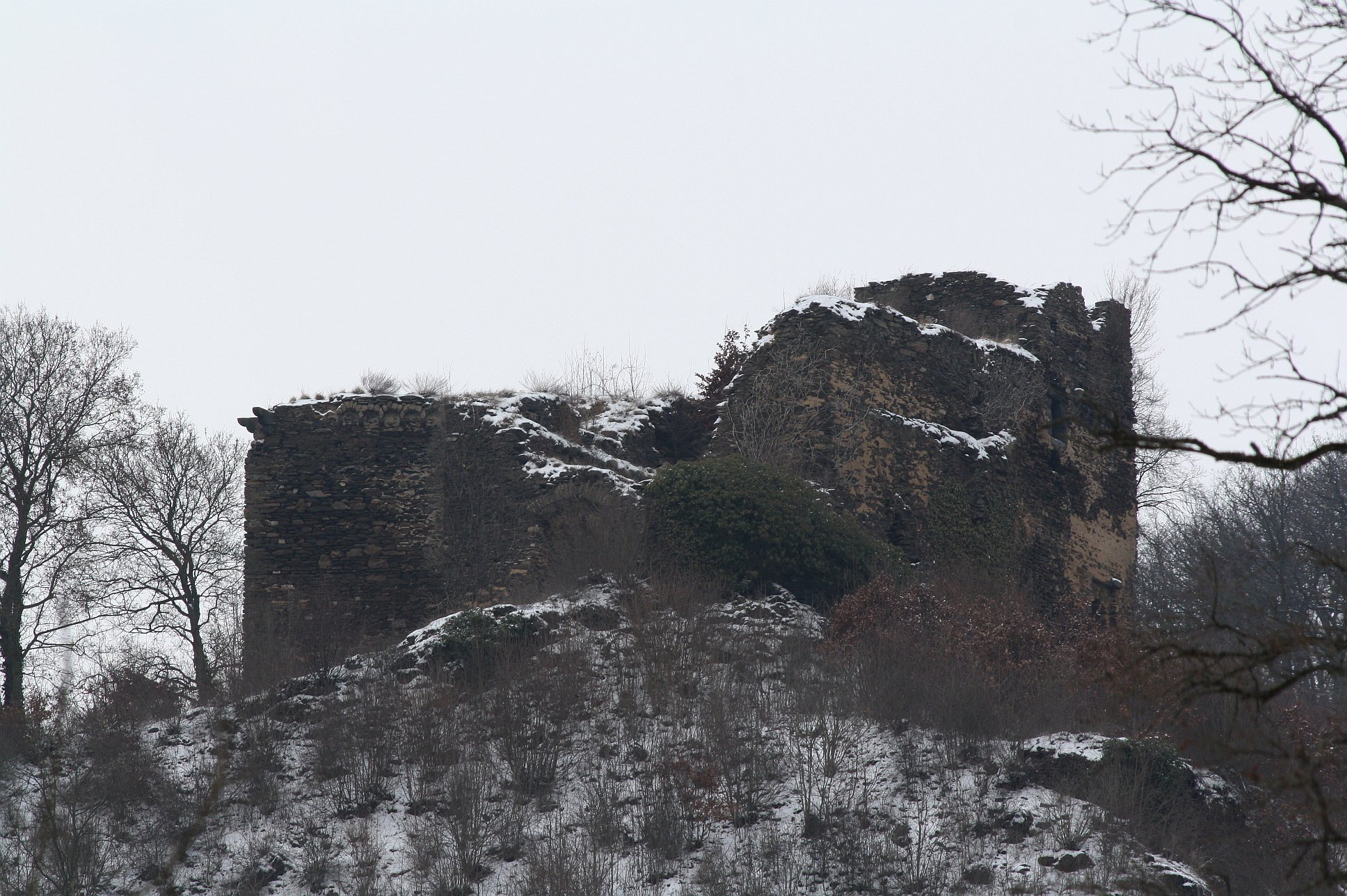
Front view

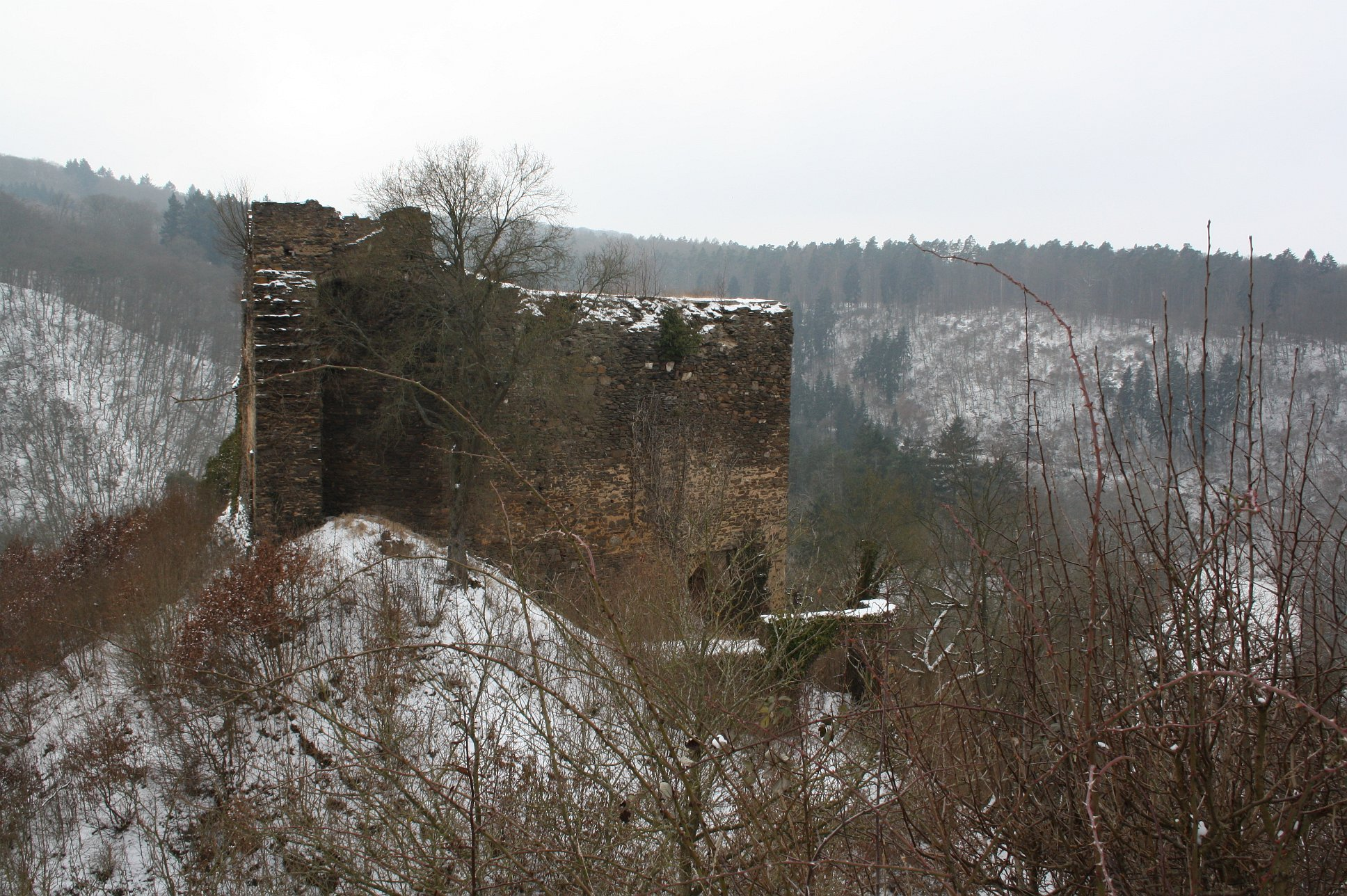
Entrance

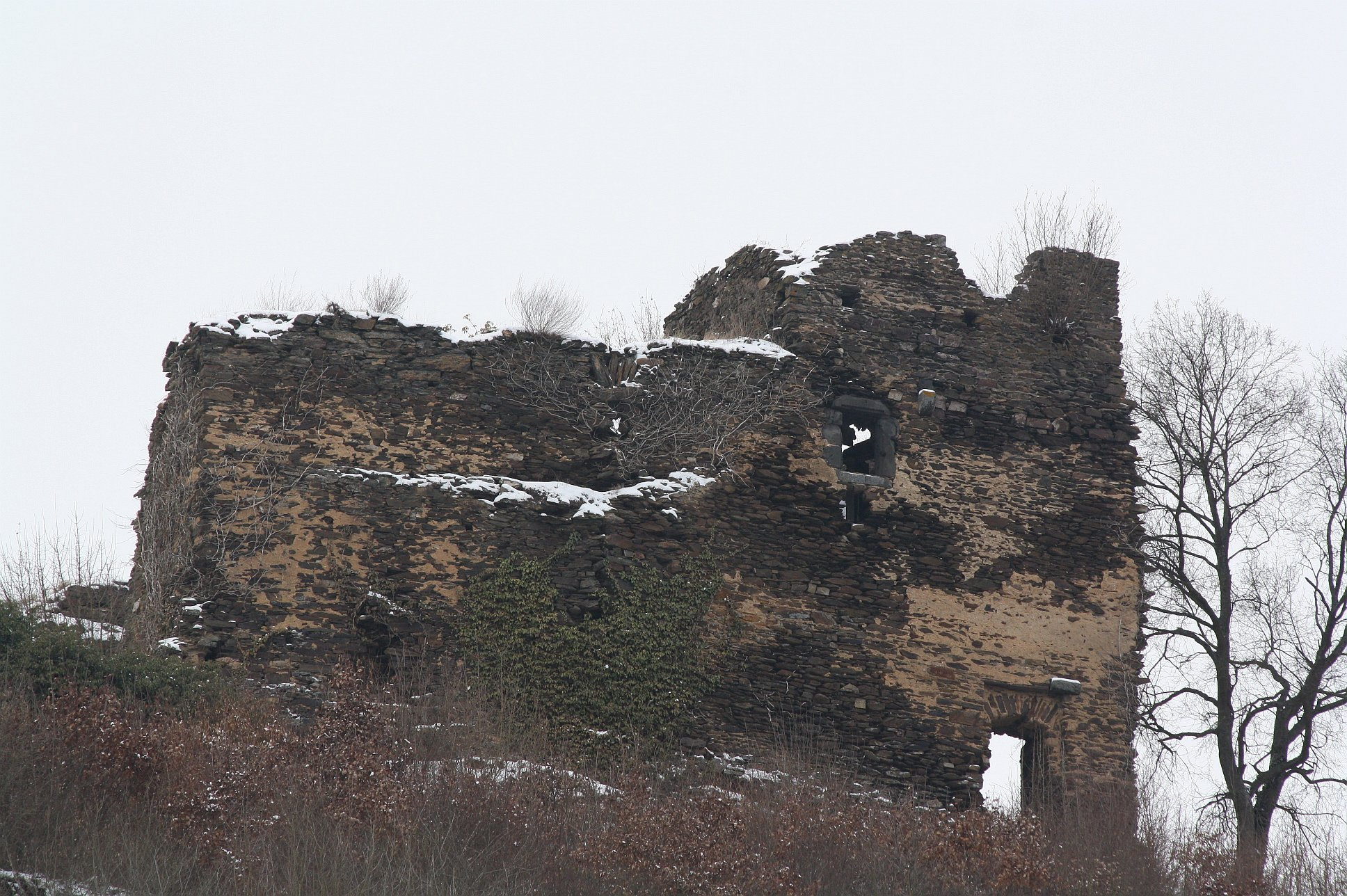
Rear side

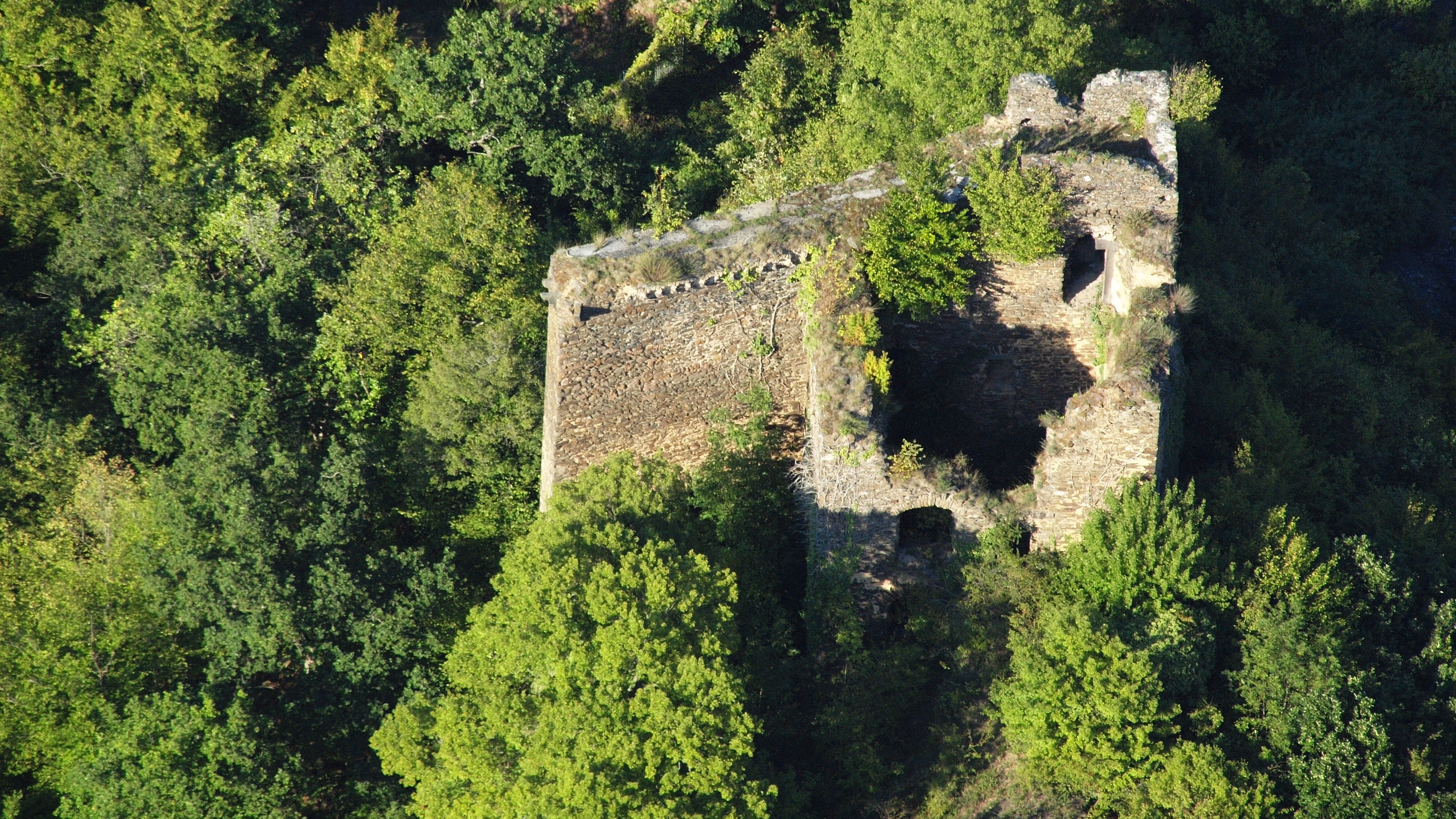
2015 aerial photograph of Trutzeltz Castle

== Literature ==
- Wilfrid Tittmann: Die Eltzer Büchsenpfeile von 1331–1333. In: Waffen- und Kostümkunde. Vol. 36, 1994, pp. 117–128.
- Wilfrid Tittmann: Die Eltzer Büchsenpfeile von 1331–1333 (Part 2). In: Waffen- und Kostümkunde. Vol. 37, 1995, pp. 53–64.
- Alexander Thon/Stefan Ulrich: Von den Schauern der Vorwelt umweht.... Burgen und Schlösser an der Mosel. Schnell & Steiner, Regensburg, 2007, ISBN 978-3-7954-1926-4, p. 144–147.
- Friedrich Wilhelm Emil Roth: Geschichte der Herren und Grafen zu Eltz, unter besonderer Berücksichtigung der Linie vom Goldenen Löwen zu Eltz. Vol. 1, Mainz, 1889 (online)
- Friedrich Wilhelm Emil Roth: Geschichte der Herren und Grafen zu Eltz, unter besonderer Berücksichtigung der Linie vom Goldenen Löwen zu Eltz. Vol. 2, Mainz, 1890 (online)
