= Rauschenburg =

- Burg Rauschenberg
- Mermuth
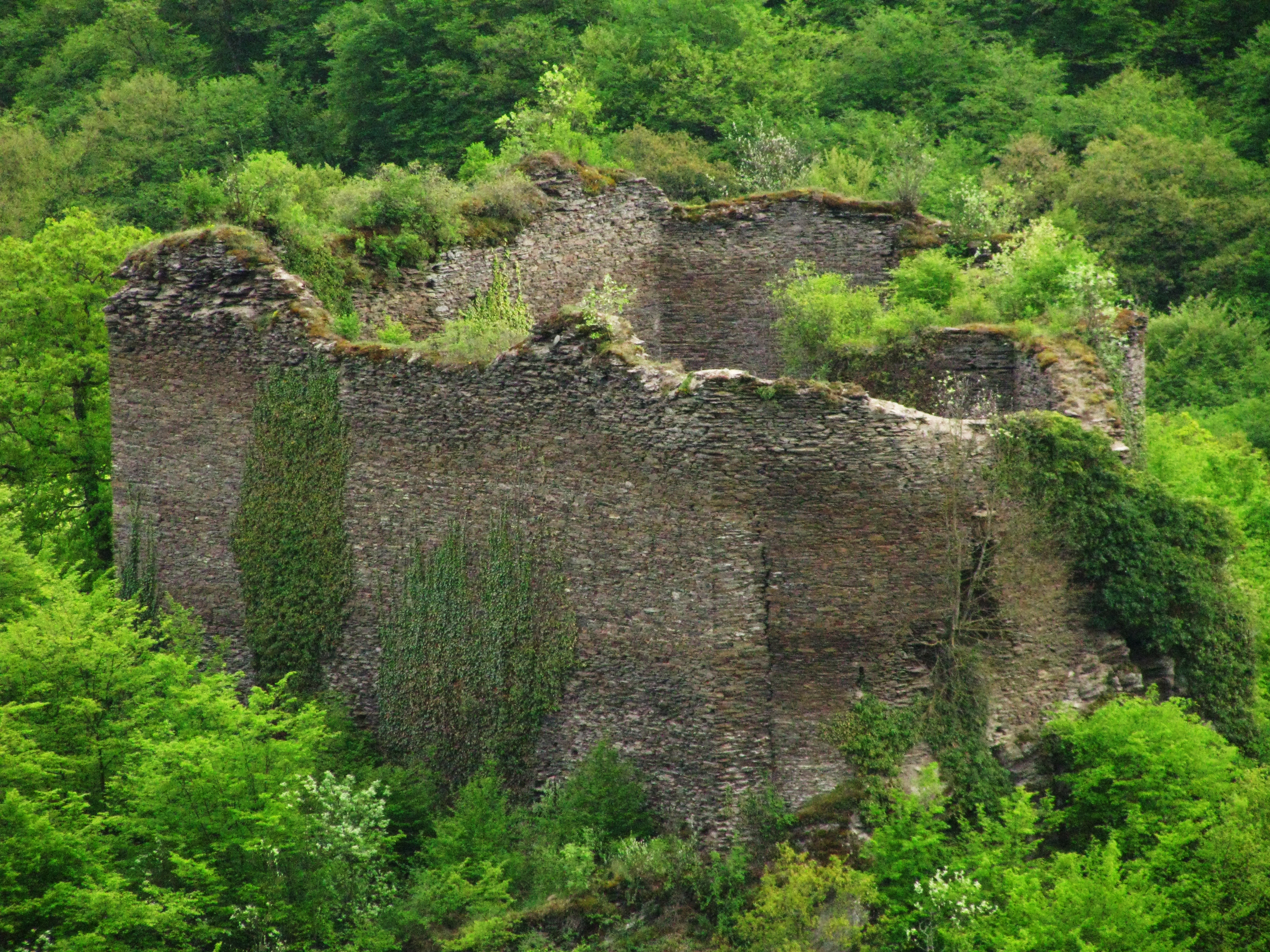
- The last remains of the castle

Site information
- Type: hill castle
- Code: DE-RP
- Condition: Ruins, wall remains

Location
- Coordinates: 50°10′56″N 7°28′52″E
- Height: 250 m above sea level (NN)

Site history
- Built: 1332

Garrison information
- Occupants: counts

The Rauschenburg, also called Rauschenburg Castle (German: Burg Rauschenberg), is the medieval ruin of a hill castle, located at around 250 metres above sea level, above the Ehrbach stream in the parish of Mermuth in the county of Rhein-Hunsrück-Kreis in the German state of Rhineland-Palatinate.

== History ==
In 1332 the Archbishop of Trier, Baldwin of Luxembourg, built the Rauschenburg during the Eltz Feud. It acted as a counter castle designed to defeat his opponents, the joint tenants of the castles of Waldeck, Schöneck and Ehrenburg who were rebelling against their vassal status. Later tenants of the castle, which was enfeoffed by the Archbishopric of Trier, was divided among several families, including the Schönecks, von Eichs, Waldbott of Bassenheim and Boos of Waldeck).

== Description ==
The castles comprises a pentagonal enceinte. Almost the entire site was surrounded by a second lower defensive wall. On the uphill side was a neck ditch cuts across the saddle and would have formed the first obstacle to any attack. The remains of the gateway and foundations of the bridge may still be seen there. In the inner bailey are the ruins of residential buildings. In the centre of the western part of the enceinte are the remains of a tower, perhaps the old bergfried. In addition, the site is accessed via two surviving gates. A third gate in the southeastern section of the outer wall was probably wall up in the Middle Ages.

== Literature ==
- Alexander Thon/Stefan Ulrich, "Von den Schauern der Vorwelt umweht...". Burgen und Schlösser an der Mosel, Regensburg: Schnell & Steiner, 2007, pp. 116–119. ISBN 978-3-7954-1926-4
- Michael Hammes, Achim H. Schmidt: "Eine Burg auf hoh(l)em Fels...-" Die Rauschenburg bei Mermuth, Rhein-Hunsrück-Kreis. Ergebnisse einer baugeschichtlichen Beobachtung. In: Abenteuer Archäologie, issue no. 9, 2014, pp. 31–43 ISSN 1615-7125
- Gustav Schellack, Willi Wagner: Burgen und Schlösser im Hunsrück-, Nahe- und Moselland. Kastellaun, 1976.
- Olaf Wagener: Rauschenburg und Trutz-Eltz, zwei Gegenburgen des Erzbischofs Balduin von Trier im Vergleich, in: Burgen und Schlösser, 44th year, issue 3/2003, pp. 166 – 174.
