= Ehrenburg (Brodenbach) =

- Castrum Eremberch (12 C), Eerenborgh (16 C)
- Brodenbach
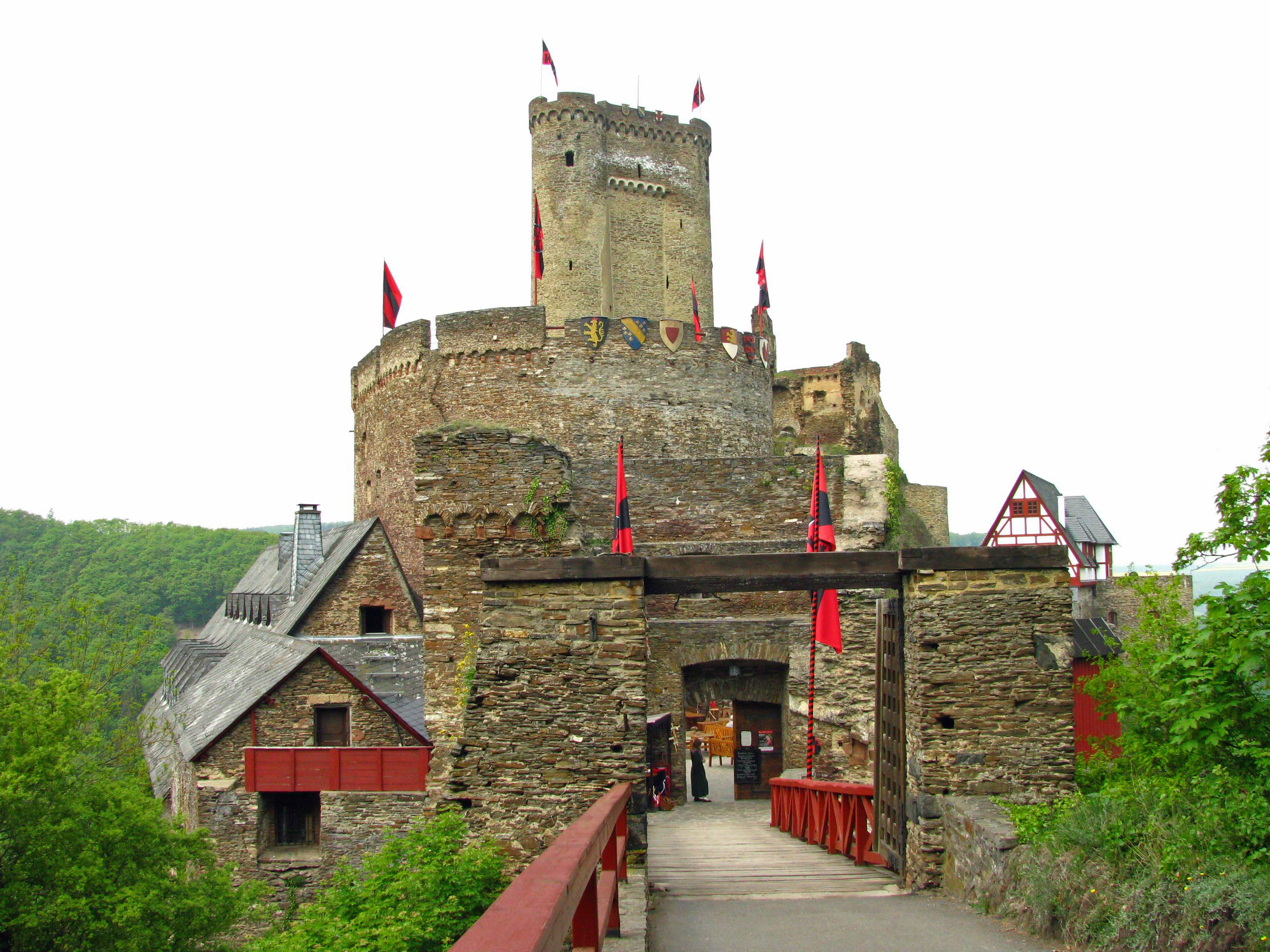
- The Ehrenburg in May 2009

Site information
- Type: Hill castle on a spur
- Code: DE-RP
- Condition: Ruins. Double tower with shield wall and tower largely survived

Location
- Coordinates: 50°12′39″N 7°27′19″E
- Height: 230 m above sea level (NN)

Site history
- Built: Hohenstaufen castle early 12 C.
- Materials: Slate rubblestone

Garrison information
- Occupants: Imperial knights, ministeriales

The Ehrenburg is the ruin of a spur castle at 230 m above sea level (NN) in the vicinity of Brodenbach in Germany. The castle had a very eventful history. It was built on a rocky spur called the Ehrenberg situated above the valley of the Ehrbach, a right bank valley of the Moselle. Once the fortified heart of a small imperial barony with estates between the Lower Moselle and Middle Rhine, it is today a cultural monument that hosts numerous events.

== History ==
The Ehrenberg was probably already owned by the church in Trier in the Early Middle Ages for use as a place of refuge and defence for the people. The oldest surviving parts of the present Ehrenburg - the upper bailey - are the remains of a fortified house, a rectangular residential tower house. The first half of the 12th century is believed to be when this initially very small Hohenstaufen castle was constructed. In 1161, the castle is mentioned for the first time as Castrum Eremberch in a deed of slighting by Frederick I, also known as Frederick Barbarossa. This document confirms the renunciation of the rights to two churches in the Archbishopric of Trier and to participation in the administration of the city of Trier by his younger half-brother, Count Palatine Conrad of Hohenstaufen. His opponent, Hillin of Falmagne, Archbishop of Trier, was by way of compensation supposed to the transfer the Ehrenburg which was important for guarding the crossing over the Moselle between Brodenbach und Hatzenport and protected the surrounding imperial estate as a sub-fief to the count. This complicated legal arranging which was intended to deal with many disputes, existed until the demise of the electorates of Palatinate and Trier at the end of the 18th century as a result of Napoleon's invasion of Germany.

The likely builders of the castle, the lords of Ehrenberg, Dienstmänner or vassals of the Cologne and Trier Church and the Rhenish counts Palatine, appear as witnesses for the first time I 1189. The castle became the site of a Ganerbschaft or joint inherited tenancy and was divided among two or three families over the generations. The Ehrenberg coat of arms was azure, a bend or. From the mid-13th century, a second, younger family (the Frederick line) bore a coat of arms in which the gold bend was accompanied by small crosses and, from around 1480, by golden lilies.

In 1331 the imperial ministeriales who occupied the castles of Waldeck, Schöneck, Eltz and Ehrenburg formed an alliance. During the Eltz Feud they fought against the territorial policy of the Elector of Trier, Baldwin of Luxembourg, who was trying bring peace and stability to an unsafe area in which the knights were becoming lawless. Five years later the two sides agreed a treaty, the Eltz Atonement, and the knights had to recognise the sovereignty of the Electorate of Trier in return for being granted burgrave status and becoming hereditary peers.

In 1397 the last Ehrenberg knight became involved in another feud with the Elector of Trier, Werner of Falkenstein and destroyed over 200 houses in his city of Koblenz. In a counter-campaign, the castle was besieged by the citizens of Koblenz and a cannon deployed (which was still rare at that time). A year later, John of Schönberg was enfeoffed with the castle and barony. In 1426 he was followed by Cuno of Pyrmont and of Ehrenberg, in 1526 by Philipp Eltz, in 1561 by the lords of Quadt of Landskron and in 1621 by the House of Hoensbroech (Dutch: Van Hoensbroeck). In the course of the Thirty Years' War the Spanish occupied the castle from 1640 to 1651. In 1668 the Ehrenburg was enfeoffed to the Freiherrn of Clodt.

On 1 November 1688, French troops und Louis XIV occupied the castle during the War of the Palatine Succession and, a year later, blew up parts of the site. The castle chapel survived and was not abandoned until the following century. After the male line of the Ehrenbergs died out in the late 14th century, the castle was no longer the long-term residence of hereditary castellans (Burgherren). For the castellans that followed the castle and barony of Ehrenberg was only a part of their fief and their estate. The last imperial knight and castellan, the Freiherr Benedict of Clodt, Lord of Landscron, Ehrenberg, Hennen, Grimberg, Meill and Thomberg lived in the late 18th century as the Electoral presiding judge (Gerichtspräsident) mainly in the Ehrenberger Hof on the Münzplatz in Koblenz.

In 1798 the castle went into the possession of the Lord of Stein. In 1831 it passed to the House of Kielmannsegg and in 1924 to the Count of Kanitz-Cappenberg. From 1991 the Ehrenburg has been privately owned and, since 1993, preserved and rebuilt by volunteers of the Friends of the Ehrenburg (Freundeskreis der Ehrenburg) from private funding.

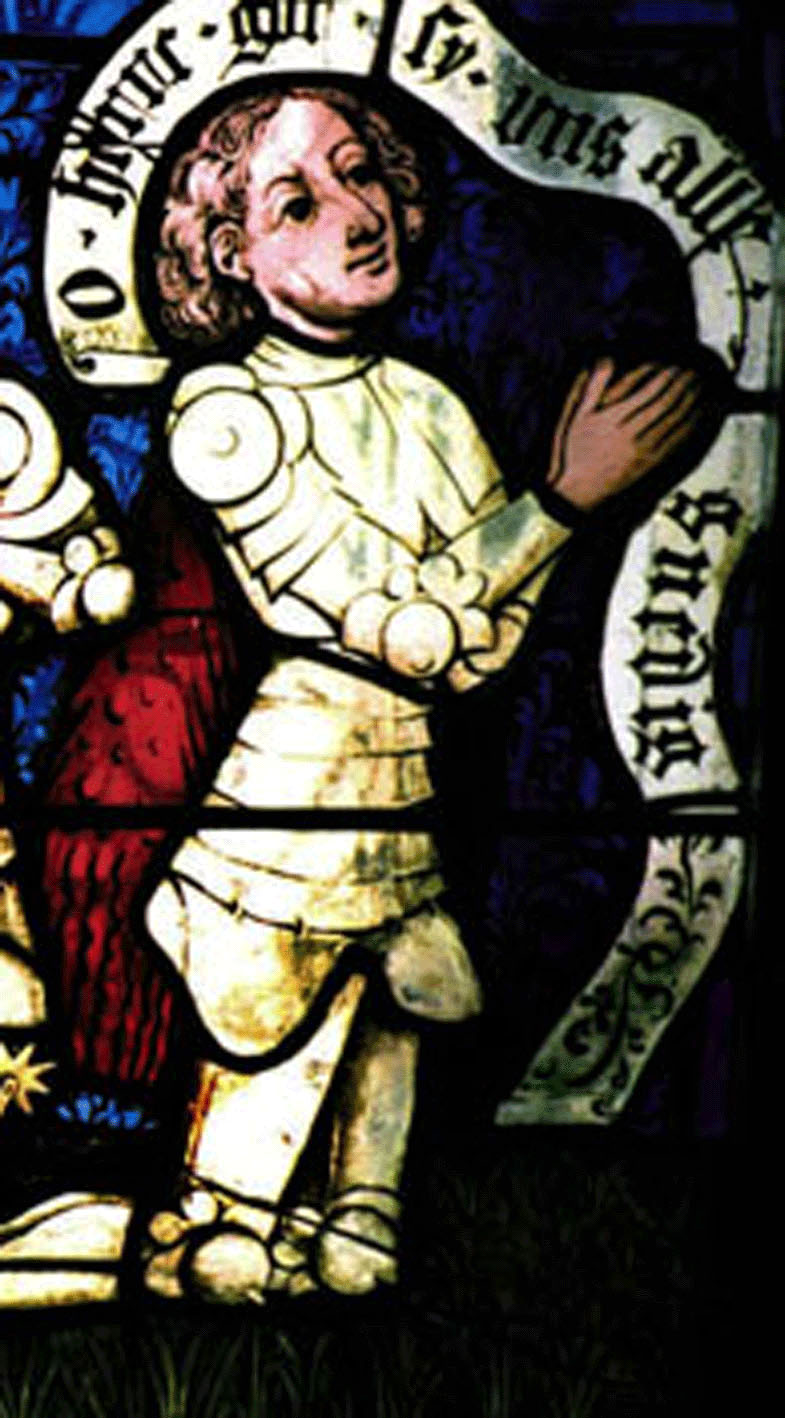
Cuno of Pyrmont and of Ehrenberg, 1446. Detail of an old stained-glass window in the Carmelite Church in Boppard am Rhein

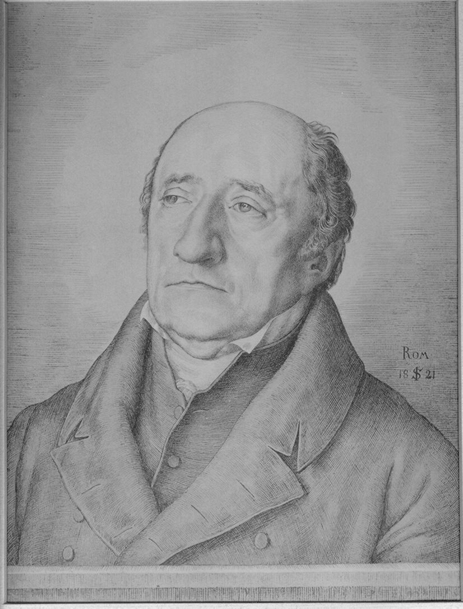
Reichsfreiherr vom Stein in 1821 by Julius Schnorr von Carolsfeld

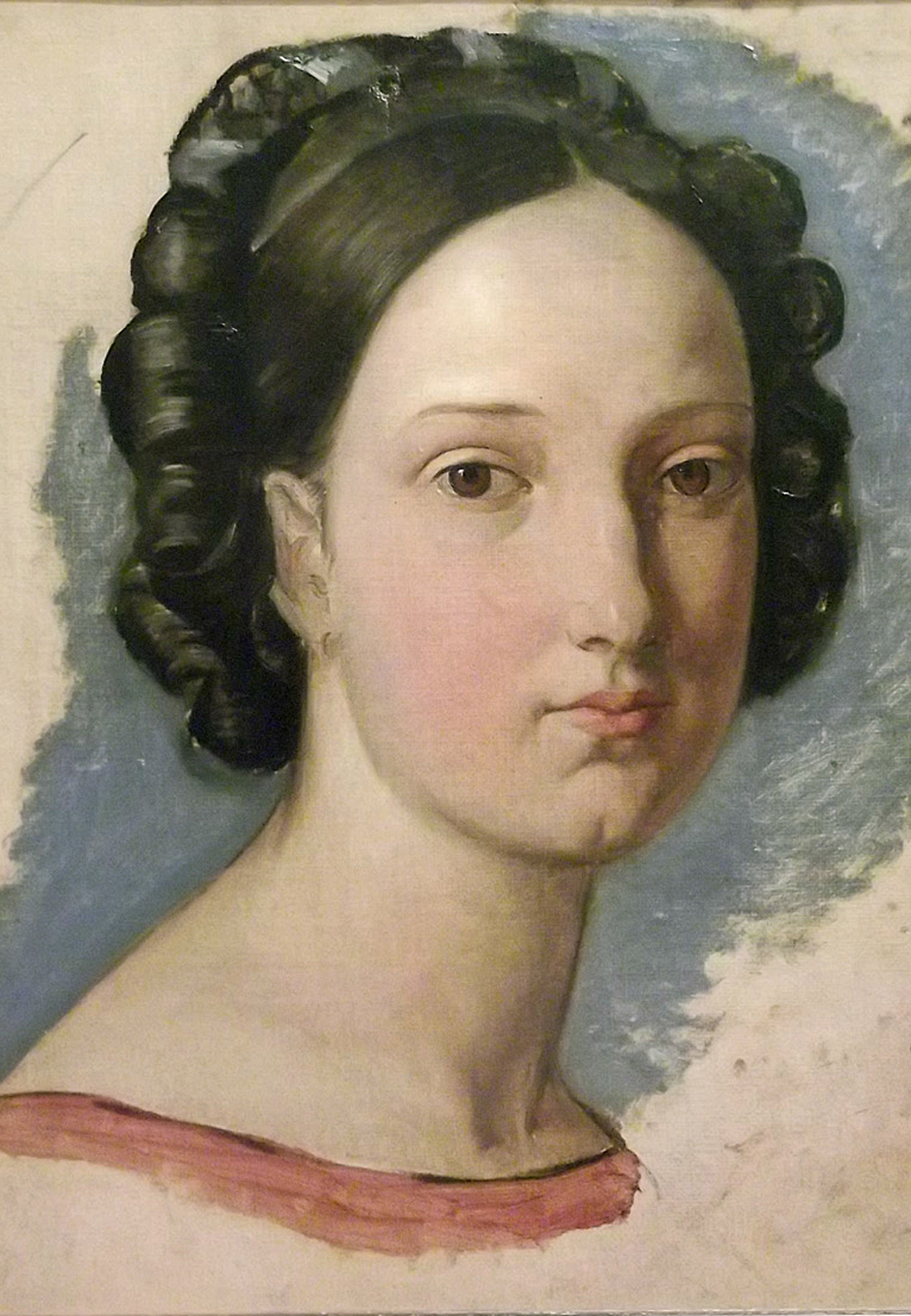
Therese vom Stein in 1820 by Philipp Veit. She inherited the Ehrenburg as the married Countess of Kielmannsegg after the death of her father in 1831

== Coats of arms of the Ehrenburg knights ==
For several generations the von Ehrenberg and, later, von Pyrmont, families were, as vassals of the Rhenish counts Palatine, imperial knights and lords of the Ehrenburg. In the late 14th century, a Cuno of Pyrmont married the granddaughter of the last Lord of Ehrenberg and quartered his coat of arms (argent, a bend dancetty gules) to the Ehrenberg's (azure, a bend or, between eight crosses pattées or).

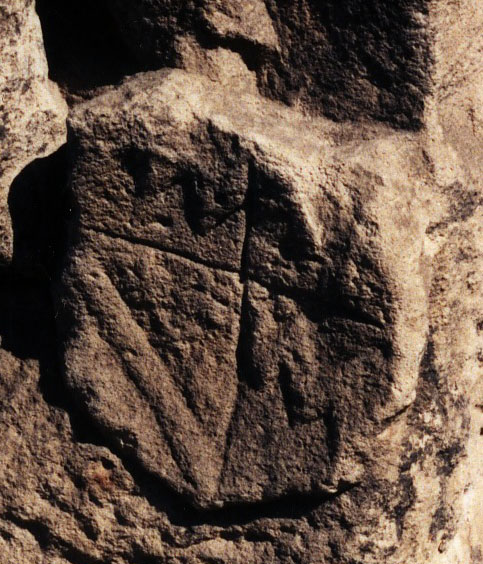
Coat of arms of Cuno of Pyrmont and of Ehrenberg. Detail of a 1446 Late Gothic sandstone votive cross in Brodenbach

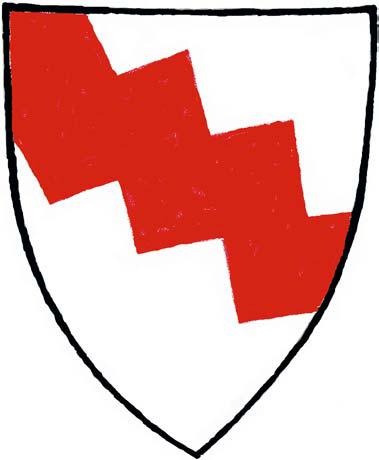
Coat of arms of von Pyrmont family from the eponymous castle in the Elz valley. On the votive cross this coat of arms is in the 1st and 4th quarters

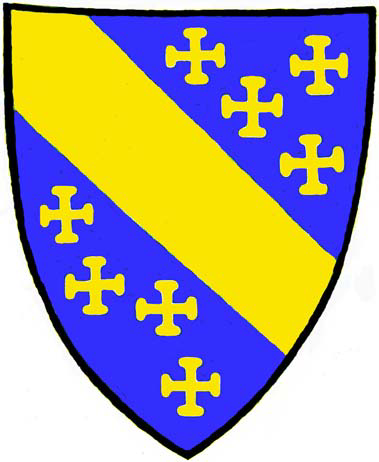
Coat of arms of von Ehrenberg family, who had probably built the Ehrenburg in the early 12th century. On the votive cross this coat of arms is in the 2nd and 3rd quarters

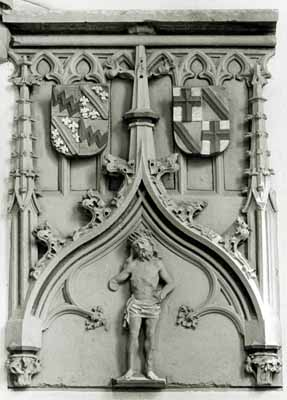
Coat of arms of Pyrmont-Ehrenberg (l) and John II of Baden, Bishop of Trier (r) Mid-15th century. In the choir of the former village church of St. Catharine of Treis a.d. Mosel

== Literature ==
- B. Hirschfeld: Die Ehrenburg auf dem Hunsrück. In: Koblenzer Heimatblätter. 17-20/9/1931, Koblenz, 1931.
- Gustav Schellack, Willi Wagner: Burgen und Schlösser im Hunsrück 4th edn., 1979, ISBN 3-88094-271-4, pp. 17–18. (= Rheinische Kunststätten, Heft 37)
- Günter Stanzl: Revitalisierung mittelalterlicher Erlebnisräume. Die Ehrenburg bei Brodenbach. Baudenkmäler in Rheinland-Pfalz Jahrbuch 2004, Mainz, 2004, pp. 23–24.
- Olaf Wagener, Achim Wendt: Die Burgen an der Mosel. Koblenz, 2007, ISBN 978-3-935690-59-1, pp. 127–167.
- Elmar Rettinger Ehrenburg (Burg). In: Historisches Ortslexikon von Rheinland-Pfalz des Instituts für geschichtl. Landeskunde, Universität Mainz. In the internet at www.regionalgeschichte.net
- Ulrich Mehler: Kleiner Burgführer der Ehrenburg. Freundeskreis der Ehrenburg, 2008.
- Georg Dehio: Handbuch der Deutschen Kunstdenkmäler - Rheinland-Pfalz, Saarland. Deutscher Kunstverlag, Munich, 1984, ISBN 3-422-00382-7, pp. 239–240.
