= Eltz Feud =

Military conflict

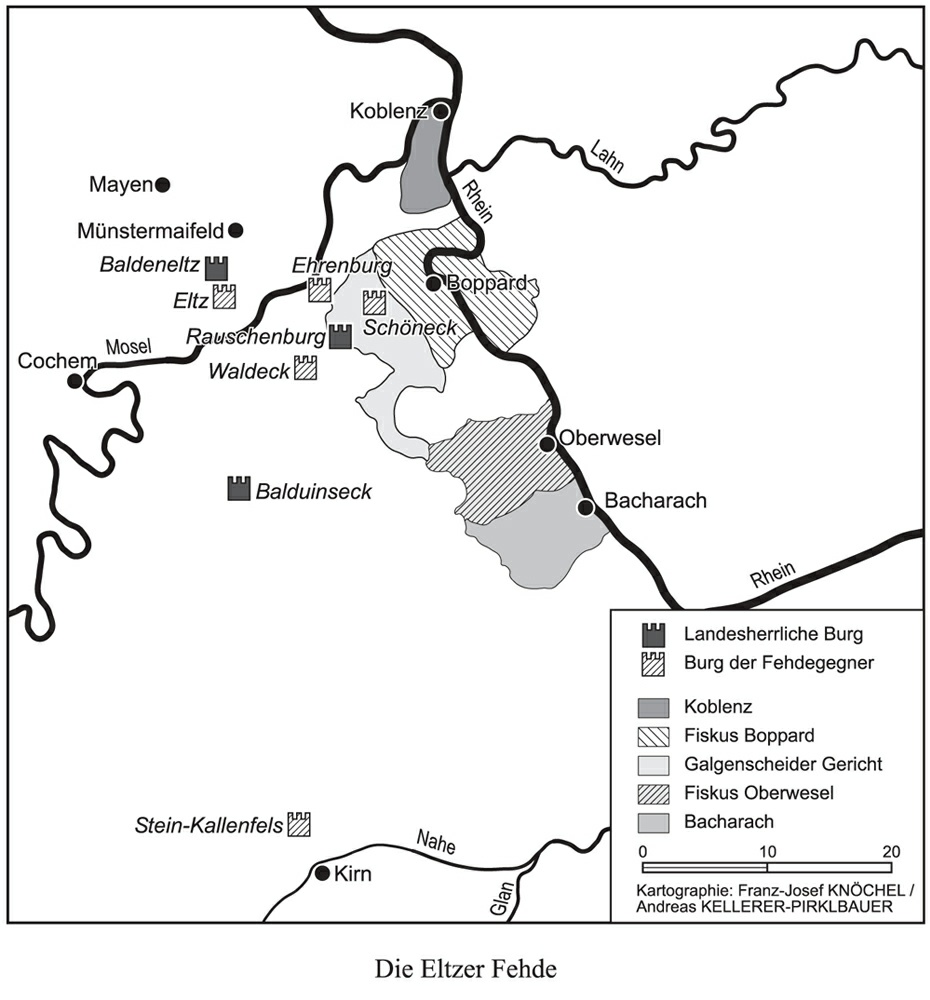
Map of the Eltz Feud (castles and territories)

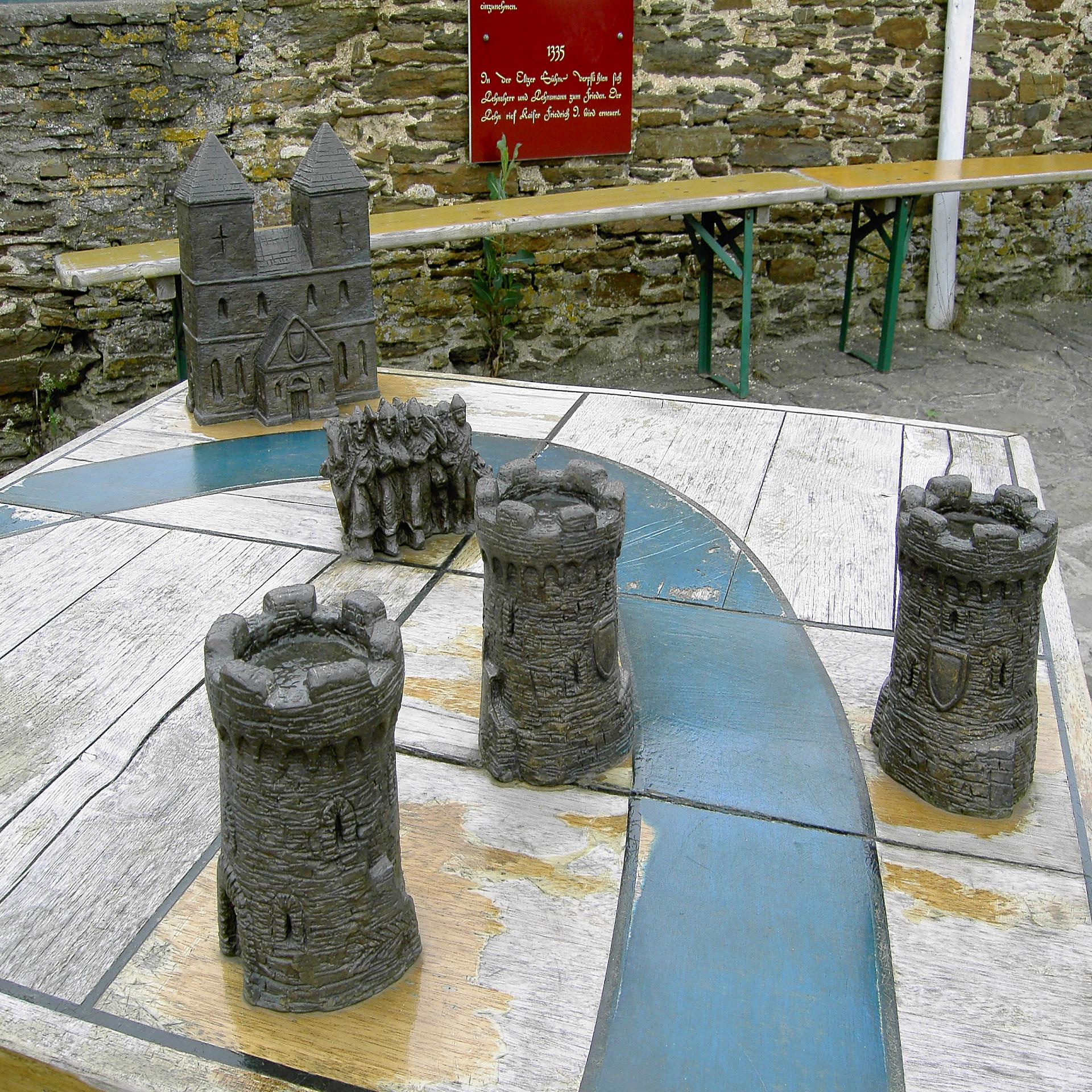
Artistic model of the feud at Ehrenburg castle

The Eltz Feud (German: Eltzer Fehde) was a 14th-century feud that arose between rulers of the Trier region on the Moselle and certain members of the knightly class who were acting independently and failing to support their sovereign princes. It came about as a result of attempts in 1331 by the Archbishop of Trier and Elector Baldwin of Luxembourg to re-incorporate the imperial ministeriales or knights of the castles of Ehrenburg, Eltz, Schöneck and Waldeck as vassals into the administrative district of Trier and to subordinate them to a unified, sovereign state administrative structure. Their distance from the power of the imperial government and a weak predecessor of Archbishop Baldwin had allowed the knights to acquire autonomy and rights supposedly under the law of custom, even though they were already vassals and fief holders of the Archbishop.

In order to bring law and order to the land, a Landfrieden agreement was sworn in the late 1420s between Archbishop Balduin and the more powerful territorial lords. This measure was designed to curb private feuds and the operations of jungle law (Faustrecht), to counter the practice of disrupting trade by travelling merchants and the movement of goods through arbitrary tolls and illegal seizures, and to prevent the use of imprisonment and seizing of hostages in order to enforce a claim. In 1317 the Bacharach Landfriede was signed and, in 1333, the Lauterer Landfriede. In 1331 a "conduct agreement" was also signed between Bishop Baldwin and the Count of Sponheim to protect travelling merchants in the Hunsrück-Nahe region and it obliged the lower regional nobility to comply with a new regulatory policy.

Baldwin decided to reinforce his electoral sovereignty by building the counter-castles of Rauschenburg and Trutzeltz (also Baldeneltz), from where he controlled and prevented the knights from joining forces with one another. Baldwin's goal was not their destruction, but their recognition of the state's laws and sovereignty. In 1336/37 the feud was probably ended on his terms and atoned for. In the documents about this feud, appear the names of the brothers, Henry the Elder and Henry the Younger of Ehrenberg, John of Eltz, Conrad the Red of Schoneck, Rudolph, William, Winand and John, called Boos von Waldeck, William Barrett, and Hertwin Winningen. To get his opponents to take their obligations to the Electorate of Trier more seriously, the Lord of Eltz was made a hereditary count of the electoral castle of Trutzeltz and the Lord of Schoneck likewise at Rauschenburg. An agreement of atonement was concluded with John of Eltz in late 1337. He appears to have been the instigator and spokesman of the resistance to Archbishop Baldwin - which is probably why this dispute is called the "Eltz Feud".

Primitive cannons known as pots-de-fer are known to have been used at the siege of Eltz Castle, which is the first recorded instance of artillery being used in Germany.

== Literature ==
- Julia Eulenstein: Rebellion der „Übermütigen“? Die Eltzer Fehde Balduins von Trier, 1331–1337. In: Kurtrierisches Jahrbuch. Vol. 46, 2006, ISSN 0452-9081, pp. 79–115.
- Julia Eulenstein: Umkämpftes „Land“ – Die Fehdeführung Balduins von Trier (1307–1354) entlang der Mosel. In: Olaf Wagener (ed.): Die Burgen an der Mosel (= Freundeskreis Bleidenberg: Akten der internationalen wissenschaftlichen Tagung. 2). Görres, Koblenz, 2007, ISBN 978-3-935690-59-1, pp. 190–204.
- Dietmar Flach: Stadtrecht und Landesherrschaft in Kurtrier unter Erzbischof Balduin. In: Franz-Josef Heyen (ed.): Balduin von Luxemburg. Erzbischof von Trier – Kurfürst des Reiches. 1285–1345. Festschrift aus Anlass des 700. Geburtsjahres (= Quellen und Abhandlungen zur mittelrheinischen Kirchengeschichte. Vol. 53). Verlag der Gesellschaft für Mittelrheinische Kirchengeschichte, Mainz 1985, pp. 317–340. (digitalised)
- In gleicher Ausgabe: Marlene Nikolay-Panter: Landfriedensschutz unter Balduin von Trier. pp. 341–355.
- Johannes Mötsch: Die Balduineen. Aufbau, Entstehung und Inhalt der Urkundensammlung des Erzbischofs Balduin von Trier (= Veröffentlichungen der Landesarchivverwaltung Rheinland-Pfalz. Vol. 33). Selbstverlag der Landesarchivverwaltung Rheinland-Pfalz, Koblenz, 1980, ISBN 3-922018-00-0, (Also: Bonn, university, dissertation, 1978).
