= Moselkern =

- Municipality
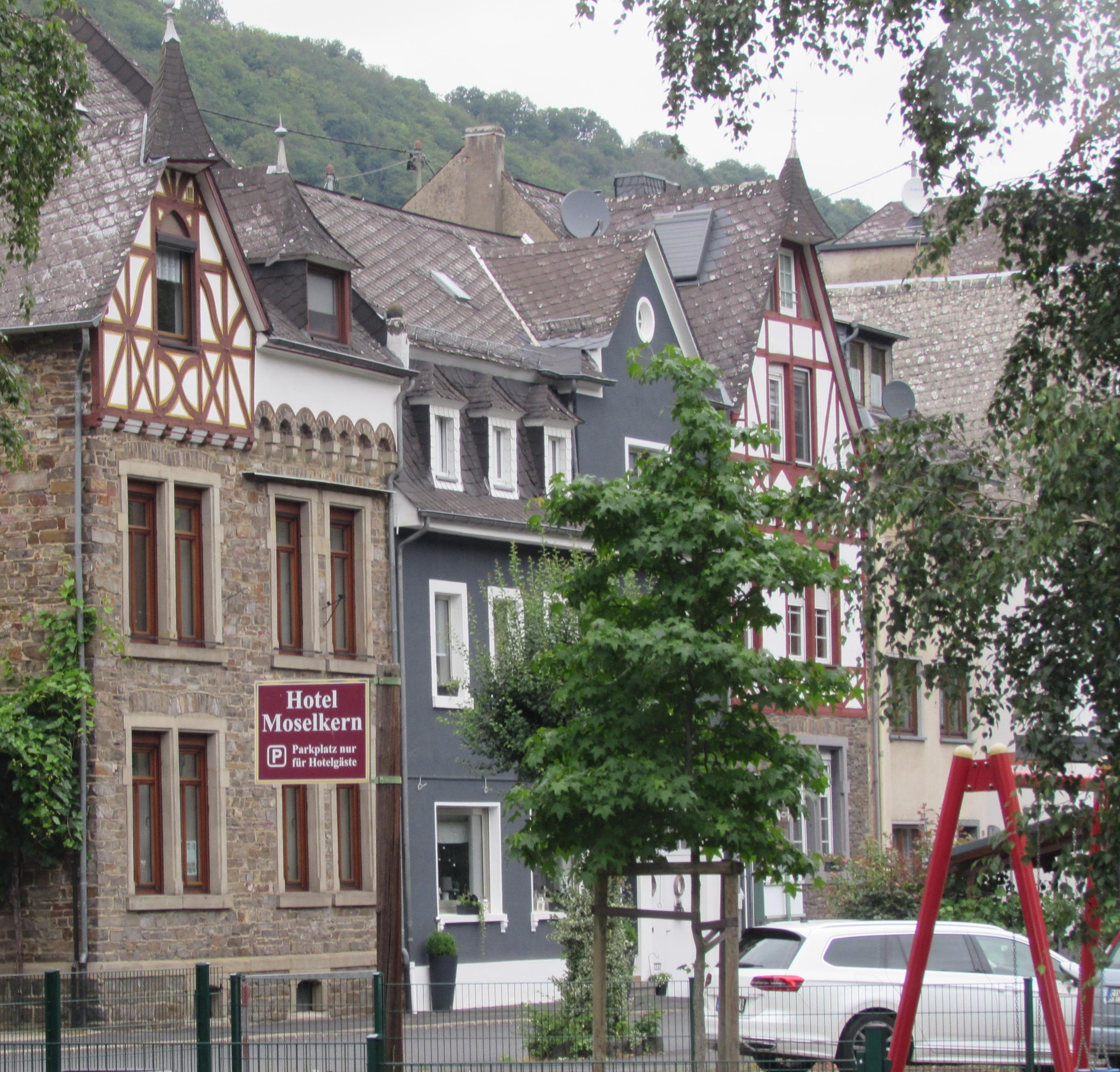
- A row of buildings in Moselkern.

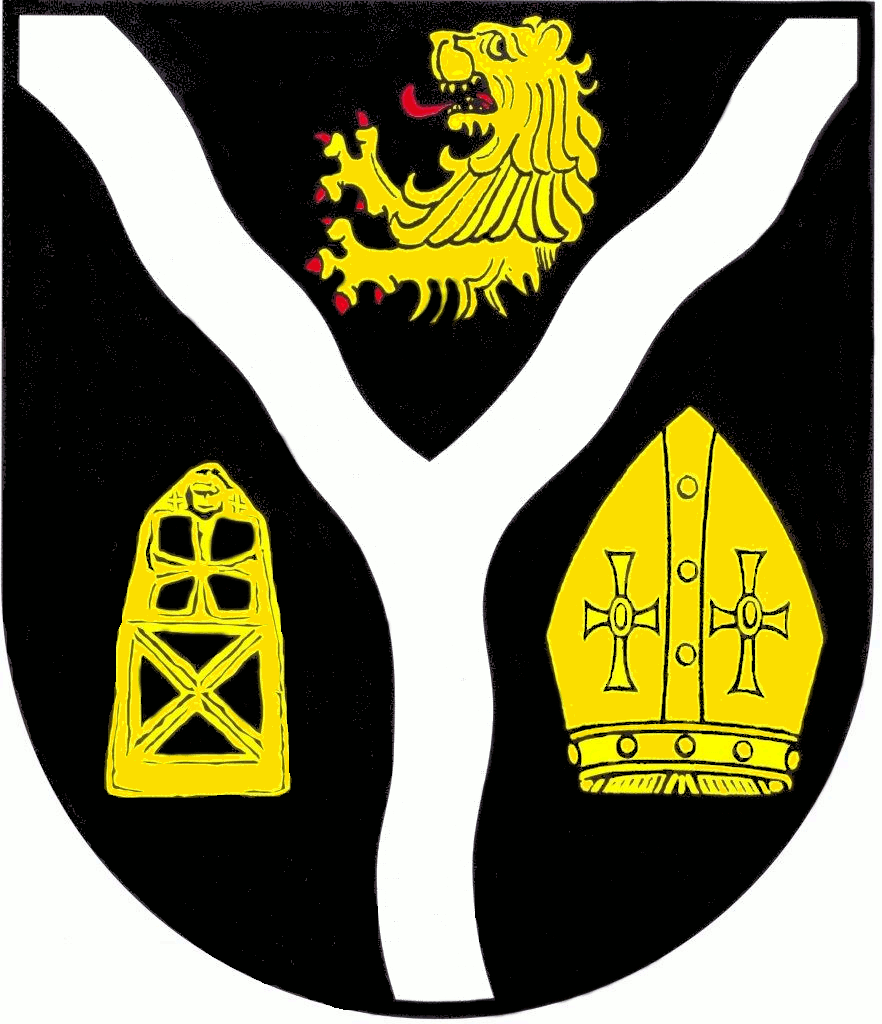
- Coat of arms

- Location of Moselkern within Cochem-Zell district
- Interactive map of Moselkern
- Location within Germany Location within Rhineland-Palatinate
- Coordinates: 50°11′37″N 7°22′16″E
- Country: Germany
- State: Rhineland-Palatinate
- District: Cochem-Zell
- Municipal assoc.: Cochem

Government
  - Mayor (2019–24): Peter Mayer

Area
  - Total: 4.73 km^{2} (1.83 sq mi)
- Elevation: 90 m (300 ft)

Population (2025-12-31)
  - Total: 568
  - Density: 120/km^{2} (311/sq mi)
- Time zone: UTC+01:00 (CET)
  - Summer (DST): UTC+02:00 (CEST)
- Postal codes: 56254
- Dialling codes: 02672
- Vehicle registration: COC
- Website: www.moselkern.de

Moselkern is an Ortsgemeinde – a municipality belonging to a Verbandsgemeinde, a kind of collective municipality – in the Verbandsgemeinde of Cochem of Cochem-Zell, a district in Rhineland-Palatinate, Germany.

== Geography ==
The municipality lies at the mouth of the Elzbach, where this river empties into the river Moselle.

=== Neighbouring municipalities ===
Moselkern's neighbours are Müden in the west, the Münstermaifeld Stadtteil of Lasserg and Wierschem in the north and Burgen and Hatzenport in the northeast.

== History ==
A villa Kerne was listed about 1100 in the directory of holdings at Saint Castor's Foundation in Karden. In 1097, Kerne was named as the only village in the district that in the Middle Ages was subject to the rural chapter of Ochtendung. In 1280, Sir Hermann von Löf, a knight, forwent one third of the tithes gathered from winemaking and cereal yields in Moselkern in favour of the Münstermaifeld Foundation. In 1337, Johann von Eltz, Burgrave at Baldeneltz, held a fief in Moselkern from the Electorate of Trier. In 1424, Johann von Eltz was enfeoffed by the Electorate of Trier with his father Richard's fief, which comprised, among other things, vineyards in Moselkern. In 1442, he was enfeoffed with benefits from winemaking, an estate and taxes out of his wife Agnes von Kobern's holdings by the Electorate of Trier. By 1794, the estate was still held by the Counts of Eltz, albeit jointly with the Counts of Leyen. A priest in Kerne was mentioned in Rudolf von Polch's will. In the Taxa generalia, which came into being about 1330, Moselkern was listed as “capella sive plebania” (“chapel or presbytery”) with a priest who celebrated Early Mass. In the 16th century it is likely that the church was granted full parochial rights to the veneration of Saint Valerius. It is from this time, too, that the figure of the holy bishop Valerius on the side altar to the right comes. Today's church building was built to plans by Electoral-Trier master builder Wirth in 1789.

Trier's lordship ended only a few years later with the occupation of the lands on the Rhine’s left bank by French Revolutionary troops in 1794. In 1814 Moselkern was assigned to the Kingdom of Prussia at the Congress of Vienna. Since 1946, it has been part of the then newly founded state of Rhineland-Palatinate.

== Politics ==
=== Municipal council ===
The council is made up of 12 council members, who were elected by majority vote at the municipal election held on 7 June 2009, and the honorary mayor as chairman.

=== Mayor ===
Moselkern’s mayor is Peter Mayer.

=== Coat of arms ===
The German blazon reads: In schwarz eine silberne wellenförmige Deichsel, oben ein rotbewehrter und -gezungter goldener Löwenkopf, vorne ein goldener Grabstein, hinten eine goldene Mitra.

The municipality’s arms might in English heraldic language be described thus: Sable a pall wavy argent between, in chief a lion rampant erased below the shoulders Or armed and langued gules, in dexter the Moselkern Merovingian gravestone of the third and in sinister a mitre of the same.

The wavy pall (the Y-shaped ordinary) refers to the municipality’s location at the mouth of the Elzbach, where it flows into the Moselle. The gravestone charge is an image of one unearthed about 1800 in Moselkern. It is of Merovingian origin and dates from the 7th century. It is one of the Western World’s earliest monumental Christian images. The mitre recalls the church’s patron saint, Valerius. His image can be found on the seals used by the court and Schöffen (roughly “lay jurists”) from 1562 and 1765.

The arms were designed by A. Friderichs of Zell and have been borne since 12 February 1982.

== Culture and sightseeing ==
=== Buildings ===
The following are listed buildings or sites in Rhineland-Palatinate’s Directory of Cultural Monuments:

- Saint Valerius’s Catholic Parish Church (Pfarrkirche St. Valerius), Oberstraße 57 – aisleless church, 1788-1790, Romanesque west tower, gate portal marked 1781; above the gate portal a pietà, marked 1681; Merovingian gravestone (cast); missionary cross, 18th century; attendant figures of the old high altar, 18th century; grave cross, 1755; basalt cross, 1766; tomb slab, 1791; Coronation of the Virgin, early 18th century; tomb with vase; warriors’ memorial, Baroque Revival pylon with relief
- Bahnhof Moselkern – railway station; one-floor reception hall, timber-frame goods shed, two-floor commercial wing with dwelling, Swiss chalet style, 1909; whole complex with tracks
- Bergweg 1 – quarrystone building, about 1900/1910
- Elztalstraße – Alte Lohmühle (“Old Dyeing Mill”); 19th century; Late Historicist quarrystone villa, late 19th century; two quarrystone mill buildings; factory building; whole complex with garden
- Fährstraße 2 – Hotel “Burg Eltz”; three-floor quarrystone building, marked 1902
- Kirchstraße 2 – building with half-hipped roof, marked 1767
- Kirchstraße 5 – timber-frame house, partly solid, marked 1629
- Kirchstraße/corner of Moselstraße – garden with corner pavilions
- Moselstraße – two-arch bridge, marked 1892
- Moselstraße 5 – former Halfenhaus (house for a tenant who owed the landlord half his earnings); timber-frame building, partly solid, half-hipped roof, marked 1738
- Moselstraße 10 – niche figure, 19th or 20th century
- Moselstraße 13 – three-floor Classicist timber-frame house, plastered, half-hipped roof, addition with cast-iron loggia, about 1900
- Moselstraße 15 – wayside cross, 19th century
- Moselstraße 31 – Late Historicist quarrystone villa, partly timber-frame, Moselle style, about 1900
- Moselstraße 33 – Late Historicist quarrystone villa, partly timber-frame, with several wings, about 1900; whole complex with garden
- Graveyard, Oberstraße (monumental zone) – chapel: building with central plan with ridge turret, 1910, architects Franz Schenk and K. Frank, Saarbrücken; Knorpelstil cartouche marked 1707; graveyard cross with place for clergy burials; in the surrounding wall (inside) 19 grave crosses from the 16th to 18th centuries, outside, niches with, among other things, a Baroque Revival pietà, 20th century; portal marked 1916
- Oberstraße 7 – winemaker's villa; quarrystone building with mansard roof; whole complex of buildings with commercial building
- Oberstraße 14 – quarrystone building, partly timber-frame, earlier half of the 16th century
- Oberstraße 21 – former Gräflich von Eltzsches Oberrentamt (High Office of Eltz Comital Revenue”); broad plastered building, marked 1709; Historicist staircase, 19th century; whole complex with garden
- Oberstraße 22 – slate quarrystone winemaker's house, 19th century
- Oberstraße 33 – door with skylight, marked 1821
- Oberstraße 43 – door lintel, marked 1722
- Oberstraße 47 – town hall; three-floor timber-frame house, partly solid, marked 1535; back possibly from the latter half of the 16th century
- Oberstraße 60 – timber-frame house, plastered, early 19th century
- Oberstraße 62 – Late Historicist-Romanticist quarrystone house, marked 1897; whole complex with garden
- Oberstraße/corner of Fährstraße – timber-frame barn, partly solid, about 1800
- Seilerstraße 1 – timber-frame house, partly solid, marked 1717
- On Kreisstraße 33 going towards Münstermaifeld – quarrystone chapel, 1876/1880; three quarrystone Stations of the Cross, Bildstock or stele types with reliefs
- Heiligenhäuschen (a small, shrinelike structure consecrated to a saint or saints) with cross; oak and basalt, marked 1689 and 1733
- Vineyard chapel, Gothic Revival quarrystone building with central plan, 1891

=== Other buildings ===
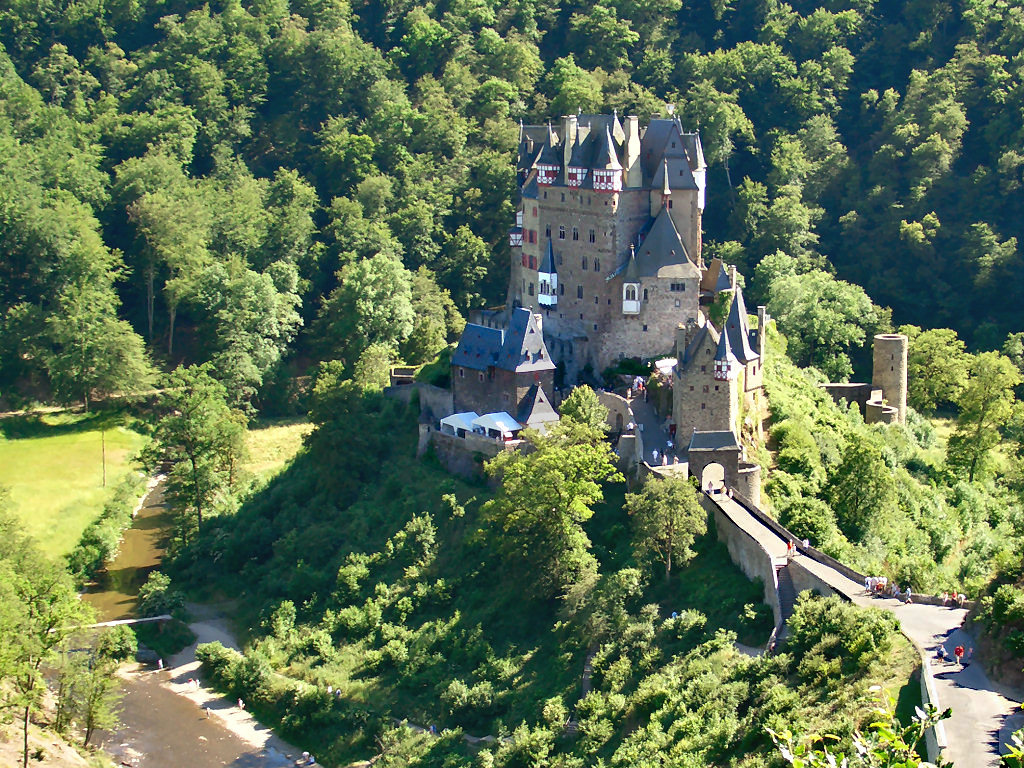
The Elzbach and the Burg Eltz

- Right near Moselkern, although within Wierschem’s municipal limits, is Burg Eltz, a still-inhabited mediaeval castle.
- Moselkern's town hall – Rathaus – from 1535 is the oldest town hall on the Moselle that is actually used as such, although admittedly, since it was built, it has at times been given over to other purposes. Over the almost five hundred years through which it has stood, it has also been a school. In 1909, a small convent with a daycare centre was set up in the building and that stayed until 1969. Since 2002, the building has once again been used as a town hall. One curiosity at this building is the metal ring mortised into the ground floor, to which, until the French Revolution, wrongdoers were fastened and exposed to public ridicule.
- A replica of the so-called Merovingian Cross from about 700, unearthed in Moselkern in 1915, stands on the church square at Saint Valerius's. It is said to be the oldest representation of a crucified Christ in monumental art north of the Alps. The original is found at the Rhenish State Museum (Rheinisches Landesmuseum) in Bonn.

== Famous people ==
=== Sons and daughters of the town ===
- Paul Gibbert (1898–1967), German politician (Centre Party, CDU)
- Ramona Sturm (1989), wine queen of Moselle 2010/2011, German wine princess 2011/2012
