= Mermuth =

- Municipality
- Coat of arms

- Location of Mermuth within Rhein-Hunsrück-Kreis district
- Interactive map of Mermuth
- Location within Germany Location within Rhineland-Palatinate
- Coordinates: 50°10′17″N 7°29′2″E
- Country: Germany
- State: Rhineland-Palatinate
- District: Rhein-Hunsrück-Kreis
- Municipal assoc.: Hunsrück-Mittelrhein

Government
  - Mayor (2019–24): Christian Busch

Area
  - Total: 4.92 km^{2} (1.90 sq mi)
- Elevation: 440 m (1,440 ft)

Population (2025-12-31)
  - Total: 231
  - Density: 47.0/km^{2} (122/sq mi)
- Time zone: UTC+01:00 (CET)
  - Summer (DST): UTC+02:00 (CEST)
- Postal codes: 56283
- Dialling codes: 06745
- Vehicle registration: SIM

Mermuth is an Ortsgemeinde – a municipality belonging to a Verbandsgemeinde, a kind of collective municipality – in the Rhein-Hunsrück-Kreis (district) in Rhineland-Palatinate, Germany. It belongs to the Verbandsgemeinde Hunsrück-Mittelrhein, whose seat is in Emmelshausen.

== Geography ==
=== Location ===
The municipality lies in the Hunsrück. Mermuth distinguishes itself by its quiet location off any thoroughfare; it can only be reached over a short branch road that leads nowhere else. The municipal area is framed by the two stream valleys each side, the Ehrbach and Baybach valleys, both of which can be reached over pathways from the village. The two entrances into the Ehrbach gorge are especially charming. In a wooded area north of the village stands the mediaeval Rauschenburg, a castle ruin.

Mermuth lies roughly 9.5 km southwest of the Rhine at Boppard and 6 km south-southeast of the Moselle at Brodenbach. The municipal area measures 490 ha and the municipality's elevation is 340 m above sea level.

== History ==
Mermuth may well be one of the Hunsrück's oldest settlements. The name is traced back to the Celtic words merre (“water”) and munt (“hole”). archaeological finds confirm early settlement.

Beginning in 1794, Mermuth lay under French rule. In 1815 it was assigned to the Kingdom of Prussia at the Congress of Vienna. Since 1946, it has been part of the then newly founded state of Rhineland-Palatinate.

Also worthy of mention is the Mermuther Feiertag (“Mermuth Day of Celebration”). It has been held for many generations in the Virgin Mary’s honour. According to oral tradition, a pledge was made, after the village had been beset by a whole series of fires over a short time – some caused by troops in the Thirty Years' War – to keep this day to secure the protection of the “Mother of God”.

== Politics ==
=== Municipal council ===
The council is made up of 6 council members, who were elected by majority vote at the municipal election held on 7 June 2009, and the honorary mayor as chairwoman.

=== Mayor ===
Mermuth's mayor is Christian Busch.

=== Coat of arms ===
The German blazon reads: Schild durch eingeschweifte grüne Spitze, darin eine goldene Kapelle, gespalten, vorne in silber ein rotes Balkenkreuz, hinten in Silber drei rote Schnallen schrägrechts aneinandergereiht.

The municipality's arms might in English heraldic language be described thus: Tierced in mantle dexter argent a cross gules, sinister argent three arming buckles bottony conjoined in bend of the second, and in base vert a chapel affronty Or.

The red cross on the dexter (armsbearer's right, viewer's left) side refers to the Bishopric of Trier. The charge on the sinister (armsbearer's left, viewer's right) side, the buckles, recalls the lordship of the family Boos von Waldeck, although here, the tinctures are reversed to the way they appear in the family's arms. On the green field between the two sides of the “mantle” partition stands a gold chapel, which is meant to refer to the local peculiarity of the Mermuther Feiertag in the Virgin Mary’s honour. The chapel, built in 1735, is owned by the municipality. The green field symbolizes the green meadows, cropland and woods found within Mermuth's limits.

== Culture and sightseeing ==
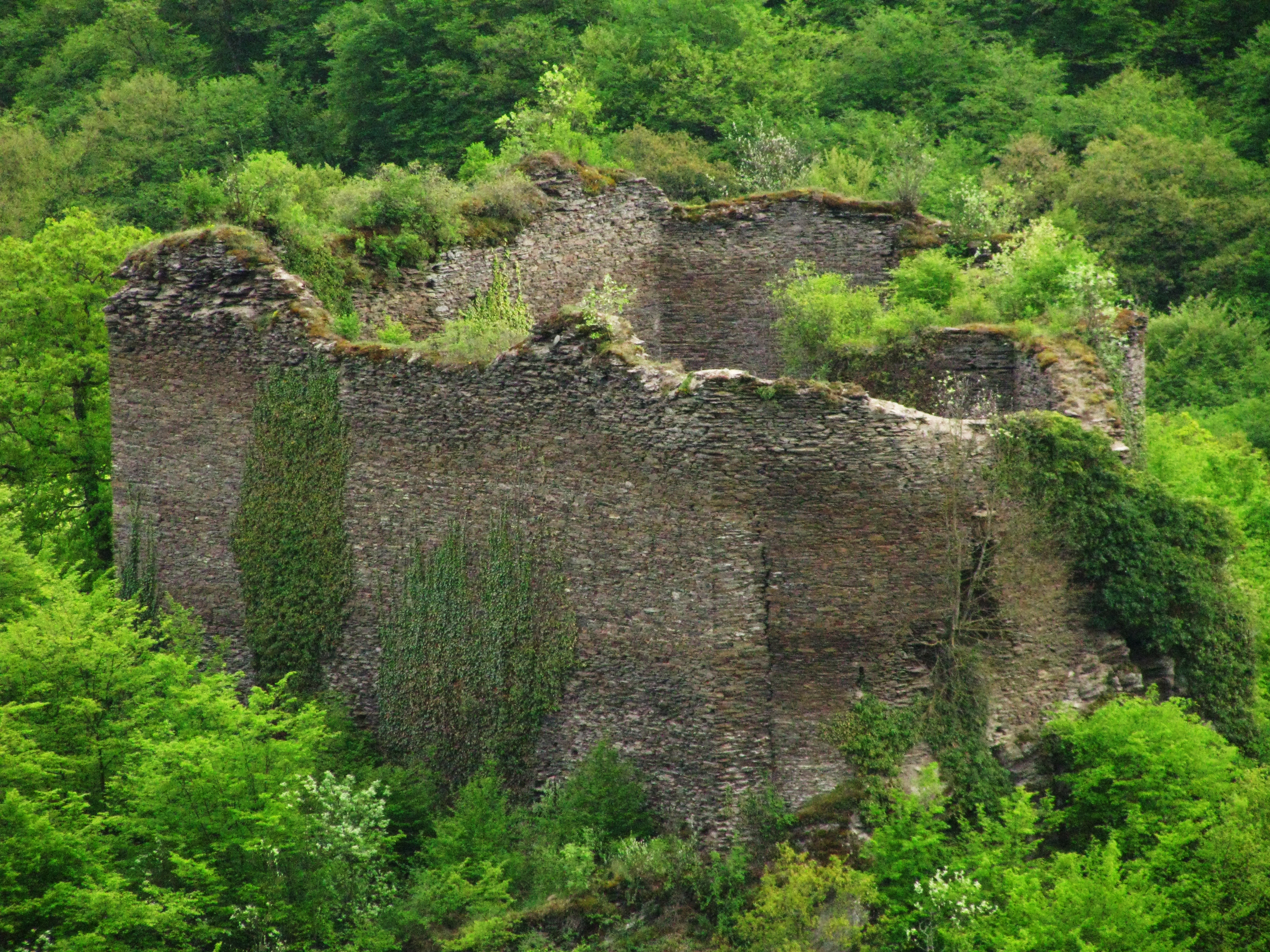
North of the village: Rauschenburg Castle ruin

=== Buildings ===
The following are listed buildings or sites in Rhineland-Palatinate’s Directory of Cultural Monuments:

- Saint Mary's Catholic Chapel (branch chapel; Filialkapelle St. Marien), Kiefernweg/corner of Lindenstraße – aisleless church, about 1770
- Hauptstraße 15 – timber-frame Quereinhaus (a combination residential and commercial house divided for these two purposes down the middle, perpendicularly to the street), partly solid, sided or slated, 19th century
- Kiefernweg 5 – estate complex, whole complex of buildings; timber-frame house, partly solid, half-hipped roof, 18th century, quarrystone barn, 19th century
- Kiefernweg 7 – building with half-hipped roof, sided with timber framing, early 19th century
- Rauschenburg Castle ruin, north of the village – built in 1332 by Archbishop Baldwin of Trier as an counterdefence against the nearby castles of Schöneck, Waldeck and Ehrenburg, destroyed as early as 1456; typical occupational castle with concentric wall complex (five-sided outer wall and wedge-shaped, jutting inner wall), on the west side a round keep and on the east side remnants of a three-floor residential building
