= Elzbach =

River in Germany

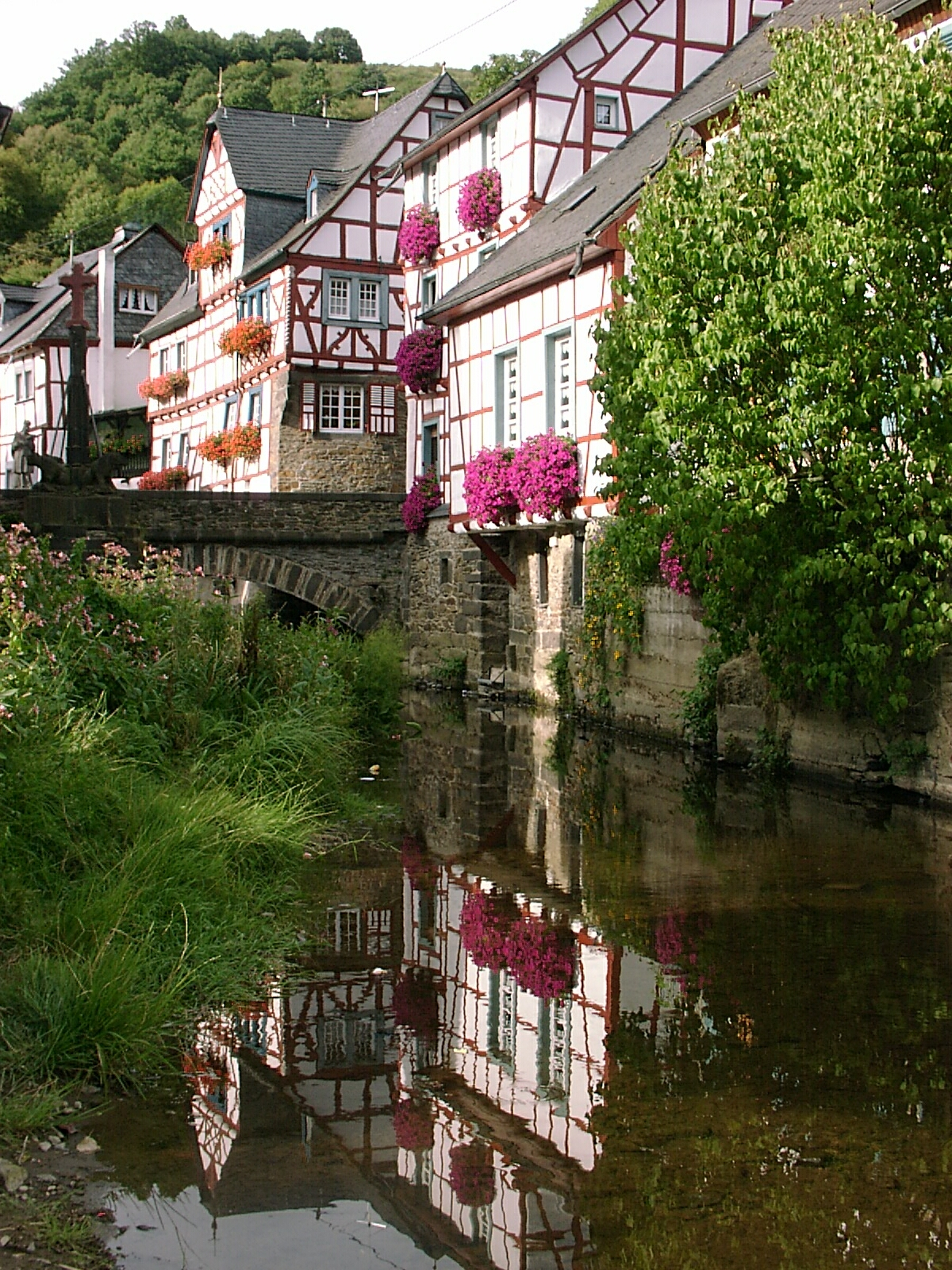
- Timber-frame houses along the Elzbach in Monreal

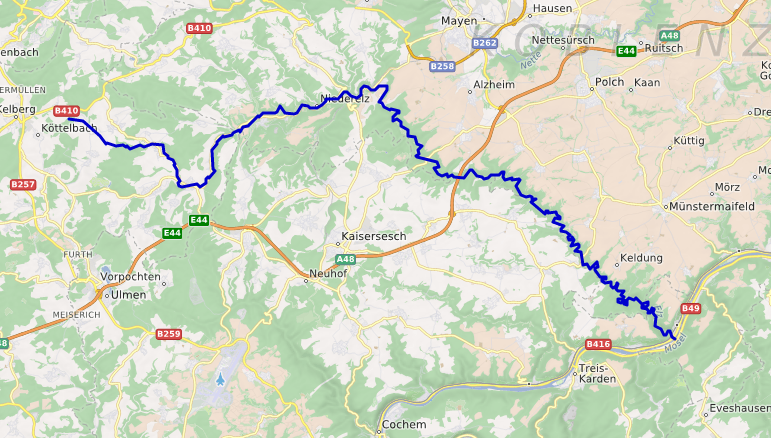

Location
- Country: Germany

Physical characteristics
- Source
  - location: Eifel
- Mouth
  - location: Moselle
  - coordinates: 50°11′23″N 7°22′8″E
- Length: 59 km (37 mi)

Basin features
- Progression: Moselle→ Rhine→ North Sea

The Elzbach (also: Elz) is a small river in Rhineland-Palatinate, Germany, a left tributary of the Moselle. It rises in the Eifel mountains near Kelberg. The Elz flows through Monreal and past Eltz Castle. It flows into the Moselle in Moselkern, in the Verbandsgemeinde of Cochem.

== See also ==
- List of rivers of Rhineland-Palatinate
