= Schloss Schöneck =

Castle in Hunsrück mountains of Germany

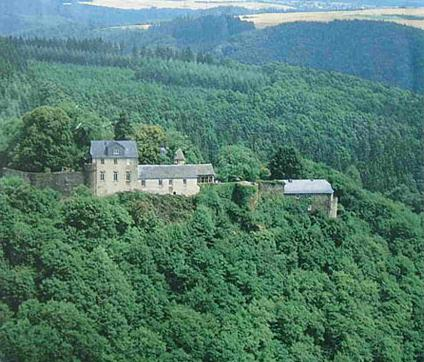
Schloss Schöneck

Schloss Schöneck is a castle which stands on a rock outcrop in the Ehrbach Gorge in the borough of Boppard in the Hunsrück mountains of Germany.

== History ==
Schöneck was built around 1200 by imperial ministerialis, Conrad of Boppard, as an imperial castle. His descendants called themselves the lords of Schöneck and lived at the castle until they died out in 1508. The family had several lines, who lived jointly at the castle (making it a so-called Ganerbenburg). It was from Schöneck that the district known as the Gallscheider Gericht was administered.

In the Eltz Feud of 1331–1336, the castle was part of the protection and defence league of rebel knights against the Archbishop of Trier and Elector Baldwin of Luxembourg. The castle became an enfeoffment of the Electorate of Trier in 1354.

In 1488 Schöneck was occupied by troops of the Count Palatine during the so-called Beilstein War (Beilsteiner Krieg) and, later, returned to the Electorate for a short time.

From 1508 onwards, the castle changed hands several times, but remained a Trier fief-castle. Between 1560 and 1646 Schöneck became the fief of a side line of the lords of Eltz. Between 1646 and about 1677 Schöneck belonged to the so-called Sötern fee tail, a foundation for the management of the estates of the von Sötern family. The mastermind of this arrangement was Archbishop Phillip Christopher of Sötern. After being enlarged with Baroque wings in the mid-17th century, Schöneck became known as Schloss Schöneck.

In 1805 the site went into private hands. In the time that followed several new buildings were added. Between 1846 and 1848 a milk spa (Molkenkuranstalt) was operated there for a while.

In 1912 the artist, Wilhelm Steinhausen, bought the site. Since 1922 it has been owned by a family foundation.

== Description ==
Schloss Schöneck now consists mainly of buildings from the 19th and 20th century. Its medieval elements include its division into an upper and lower baileys. Medieval structures include the cellars and supporting walls, towers and part of the enceinte. On the uphill side are the remains of a neck ditch.

== Literature ==
- Alexander Thon, Stefan Ulrich: "Von den Schauern der Vorwelt umweht …" Burgen und Schlösser an der Mosel. Schnell & Steiner, Regensburg, 2007, ISBN 978-3-7954-1926-4, Seite 120–123.
- Jens Friedhoff: Schloss Schöneck. Reichsministerialensitz – Molkenkuranstalt – Forsthaus. In: Olaf Wagener (Hrsg.): Die Burgen an der Mosel. Akten der 2. internationalen wissenschaftlichen Tagung in Oberfell an der Mosel. Koblenz, 2007, pp. 109–126.
