= Waldeck Castle (Hunsrück) =

- Burg Waldeck
- Dorweiler Village, Hunsrück Germany
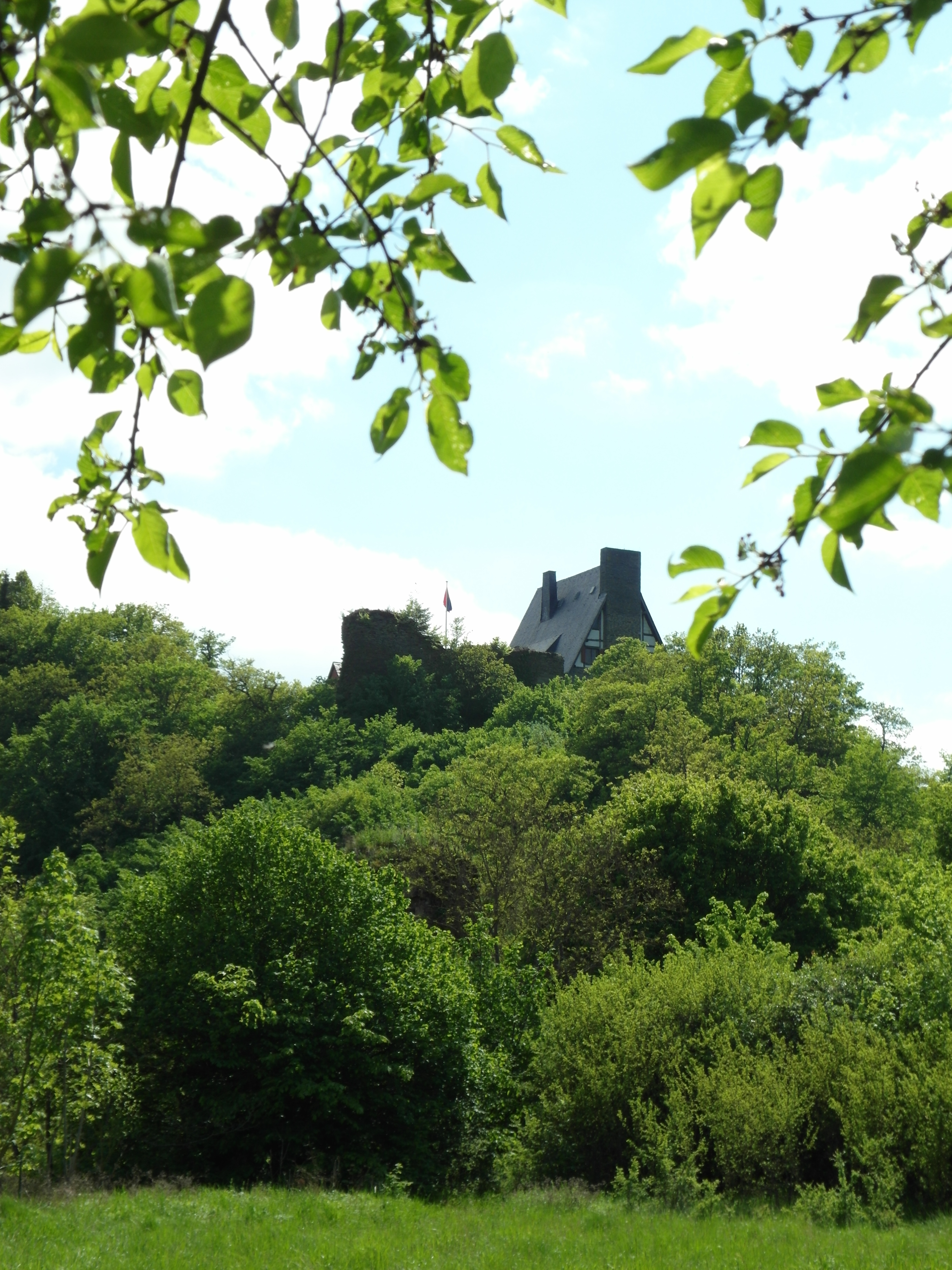
- Ruins of the upper castle with modern new buildings of the Nerother Wandervogel

Site information
- Type: hill castle, spur castle
- Code: DE-RP
- Condition: ruin

Location
- Coordinates: 50°08′58″N 7°26′00″E
- Height: 248 m above sea level (NN)

Site history
- Built: 1189

Garrison information
- Occupants: ministeriales

Waldeck Castle is a mediaeval castle ruin overlooking the Baybach valley in Dorweiler village, Rhineland-Palatinate. The site was the main seat of the Hunsrück family of Boos.

William I of Heinzenberg built the fortress in 1150 and established the Boos-Waldeck family.

The castle endured several wars, and was partially destroyed in 1689 by French forces during the Nine Years' War.

The castle was used until 1833 when the Boos von Waldeck family sold its holdings in the Rhineland.

== Historical background ==
The first documentation of a castle in the ruins' vicinity dates to 1243, when knights – Heribert, Udo (Rudolf), and Winand (surnames Boos von Waldeck, Boose of Walthecce) – gave their castle to Elector of Cologne, Konrad von Hochstaden, who in turn enfeoffed them. Rudolf's ~1250 construction of the lower bailey and both wards are mentioned in a document in 1285.

The archbishop authorized the family to act as landlords of the area, through commercial contracts with Cologne, establishing the aristocratic line of the family that endured until 1833. This main seat would be the central administration of mills, offices, and the residence for barons, counts, and noble visitors during the summer. Political connections through deals, commerce and military control against the French guaranteed almost six hundred years of influence.

The surname Boos is related to ancient mediaeval German words meaning "lead", "nobleman", or "angry", possibly used to indicate the residents of the castle, hence the name variation "Castle of Boos-Waldeck" seen in some documents. In French it is cited as the castle of "Bois Walthecce" or "Boosse de Walthecce".

Below, nearer the valley, the lower bailey was established, possibly to enclose the houses of the joint owners of the castle. It is possible that the lower ward had been built around 1250 by the aforesaid Rudolf (Udo). Some documents mention both wards of the castle in 1285. The remnants of the lower bailey were only rediscovered and identified as such in recent years when the land was prospected.

With the new building of the comital-Palatine tower, the castle now consisted of three parts: a new tower that had been built over the previous two wards (today the so-called upper bailey) and two lower baileys: the old upper (now lower bailey) and the old lower bailey.

== Timeline ==
1124 First mention of Archbishop Konrad about "Waldeck area".

1242 The knights Heribert, Udo (Rudolf) and Winand (Boos of Waldeck) buy the rights to use their assets from the Archbishop of Cologne.

1250 Building of the bailey by Rudolf Boos von Waldeck.

1325 First well-known attempt to host multiple families (coheirs) of the castle was regulated. Beside the sex of the Waldeckers, in three lines (Winandsche, Rudolfsche and Boos´sche (Heribert's) line) were also the families of Hartwin von Winningen, Metz, Sabershausen (since 1398).

1331-36 The knights of the castles Eltz and Boos-Waldeck set up a resistance force of 50 knights against the arrival of Archbishop Baldwin, but were defeated near Gegenburgen.

1361 The brothers Johann and Emmerich Boos von Waldeck recognize the authority of the Archbishop of Cologne, which was acknowledged as a chivalrous, but would not give any access to the castle.

1370 Johann IV Boos von Waldeck (d. 1370) married Else of Montfort. The great-grandchild of this married couple, Simon Boos von Waldeck, received earnings, until 1480, the ruin of Montfort (nearby). Henceforth the descendants of this bloodline would be called “Boos von Waldeck und Montfort”.

1398 Ruprecht from Pfalz conquered the castle, after Johann Boos von Waldeck had died. In the peace treaty of 29 March, Ruprecht was granted access for living in the new tower, to keep occupied "on the neck" (thus on the upper castle). Thus the authority of the Palatinate became a neighbour enhancing the influence of the family in the business of the region.

1469 Geopolitical changes partially affect the administration.

1557 Beside the Boos von Waldeck there are only two families living in the castle (von Metz and the Counts Palatine).

1689 The French partially destroy the castle.

1720 Colonel William Lothar Baron Boos von Waldeck, who lived in Koblenz, settled a summer house in the bailey.

1833 The Boos von Waldeck, facing new geopolitical trends after the Napoleonic Wars, sold all its holdings in the Rhineland, thus also the newly built Boos-Waldeck Castle.

1850 Some of the landmarks, support stones, were removed from the castle to build other houses on the ward area, accelerating the castle's decay into ruins.

== Bibliography ==
- ↑ Goerz, Adam/Hardt, Albert: Mittelrheinische Regesten, 5 vols., Coblenz 1876/86, Vol. 2, No. 608. (A Winandus, mentioned in 1184 is not confirmed, Görz Vol. 2, No. 511.)
- ↑ Vgl. Goerz, Adam/Hardt, Albert Vol. 3, No. 333 and Knipping, Richard u.a. (ed.): Regesten der Erzbischöfe von Köln im Mittelalter, Bonn 1909 – 1913, Vol. 2, No. 1078.
- ↑ Goerz, Asdam/Hardt, Albert: Mittelrheinische Regesten, 5 vols., Coblenz 1876/86. Vol. 4, No. 1236
- Hammes, Michael: Die Burgruine Waldeck im Hunsrück. In: Abenteuer Archäologie, Annual no. 5, 2003, 12 - 15. ISSN 1615-7125 (with subsequent literature)
- Hammes, Michael: Burg Waldeck im Hunsrück: In ??? (unpublished manuscript in print)
- Köpfchen: Ausblicke, Einblicke, Rückblicke. Mitteilungsblatt der Arbeitsgemeinschaft Burg Waldeck. Arbeitsgemeinschaft Burg Waldeck, Dommershausen ab 1989
- Kurt Hoppstädter, Fritz Langenberg: Burg und Schloss Waldeck im Hunsrück. Ein geschichtlicher Rückblick. Ottweiler Druckerei, Ottweiler, 1957
- Nerohm: Die letzten Wandervögel: Burg Waldeck und die Nerother. Geschichte einer Jugendbewegung. Deutscher Spurbuchverlag, Baunach, 2002. ISBN 3-88778-197-X
- Hotte Schneider (ed.): Die Waldeck. Lieder, Fahrten, Abenteuer. Die Geschichte der Burg Waldeck von 1911 bis heute. Verlag für Berlin-Brandenburg, Potsdam, 2005. ISBN 3-935035-71-3
