= Middle Moselle =

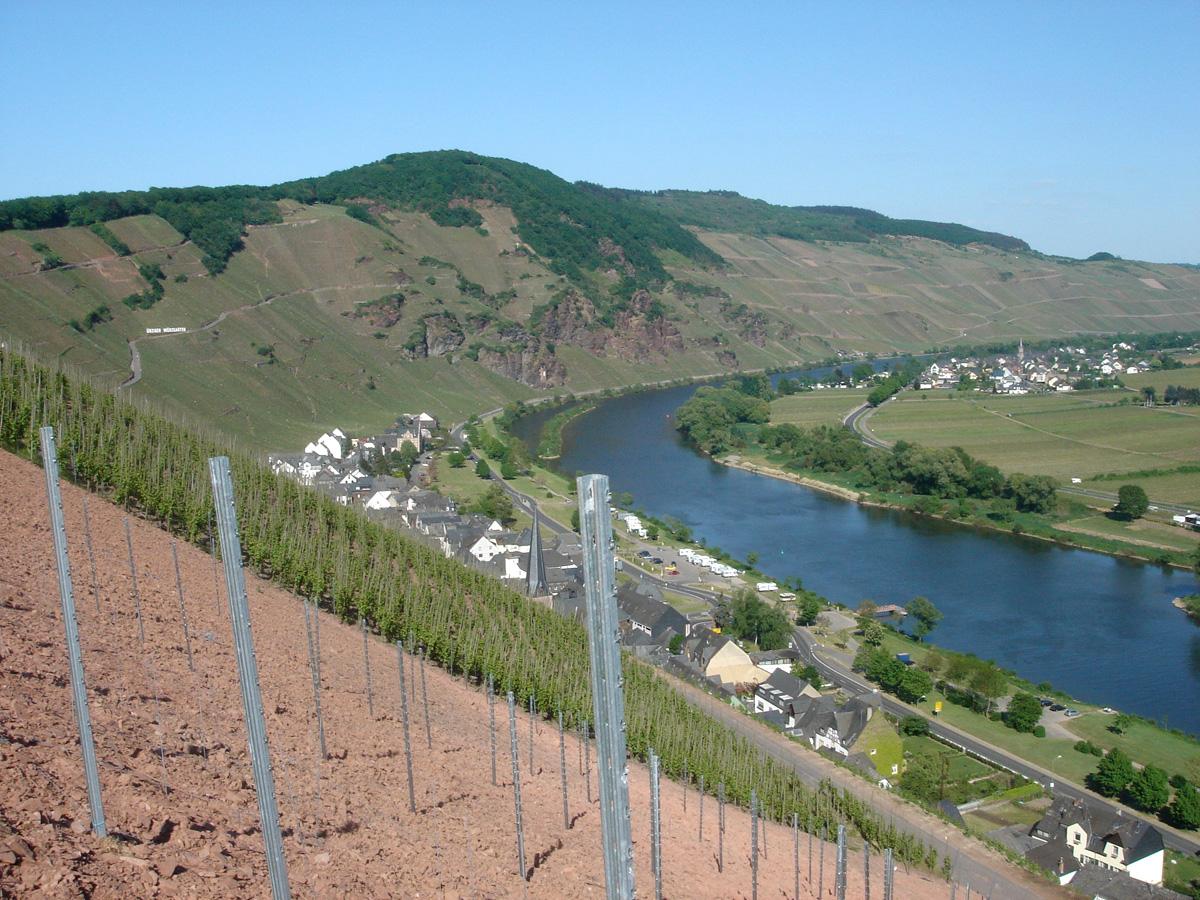
Ürzig, the Würzgarten, a vineyard on the Middle Moselle

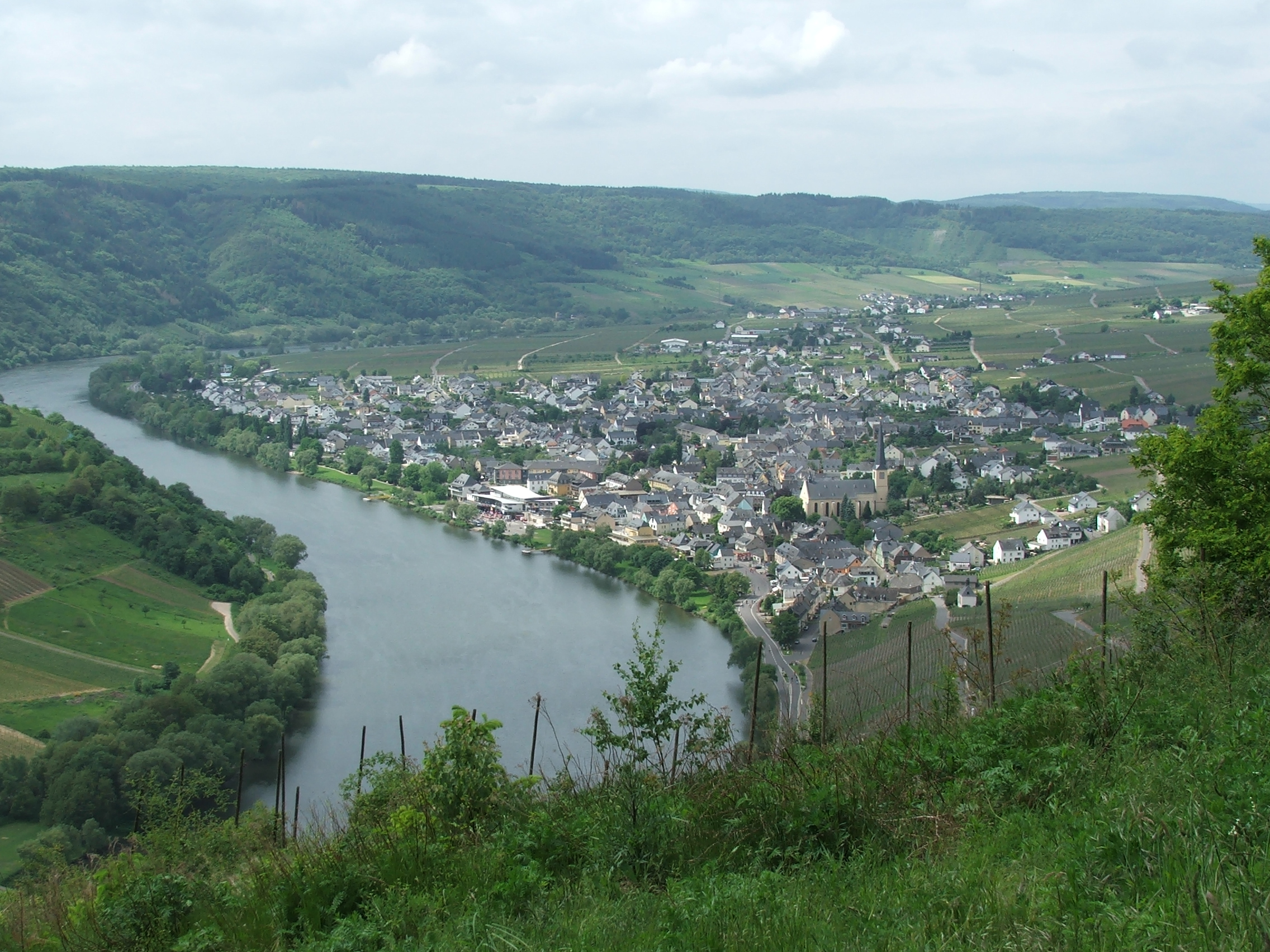
View of Kröv on the Middle Moselle

The Middle Moselle or Central Moselle (German: Mittelmosel) refers to the approximately 120-kilometre-long section of the river Moselle, in the state of Rhineland-Palatinate in Germany from the city of Trier to Zell. The subsequent section of the river to its mouth, where it flows into the Rhine, is known as the Lower Moselle.

The Central Moselle landscape is formed by the many meanders of the river, between the Hunsrück and the Eifel highlands in a deep valley with steep slopes on which the grapes for the Mosel wine are grown. There are a number of well-known wine and tourist destinations in the Mittelmosel including Schweich, Longuich, Mehring, Klüsserath, Trittenheim, Neumagen-Dhron, Piesport, Brauneberg-Filzen, Bernkastel-Kues, Zeltingen-Rachtig, Kröv, Traben-Trarbach, Reil and Zell.

The Central Moselle has been a winegrowing region since the days of the Romans. The Romans used the Moselle even then for transportation of the wines produced there.

The Moselle wine region was formerly the Moselle-Saar-Ruwer winegrowing area and is a large producer of Riesling, a white wine. Although the Moselle is not a classic red wine area, following the demand that has developed since the late 1990s, an increasing quantity of red wine is produced. Apart from the Riesling grape there are also isolated plantings of Rivaner/Müller-Thurgau, Kerner and White and Blue Spätburgunder.

The winemaking businesses in the Central Moselle also offer sekt, wine and fruit brandies and liqueurs. They market their products broadly, as in all wine regions, and present themselves in wine cellars and wine-tasting bars, small self-owned seasonal restaurants (Straußwirtschaften), and during the warm season at vineyard festivals (Hoffeste).

It has been used as a special stage for the Rallye Deutschland.

== See also ==
- Upper Moselle
- Lower Moselle
