= Lower Moselle =

Lower part of the Moselle river in Germany

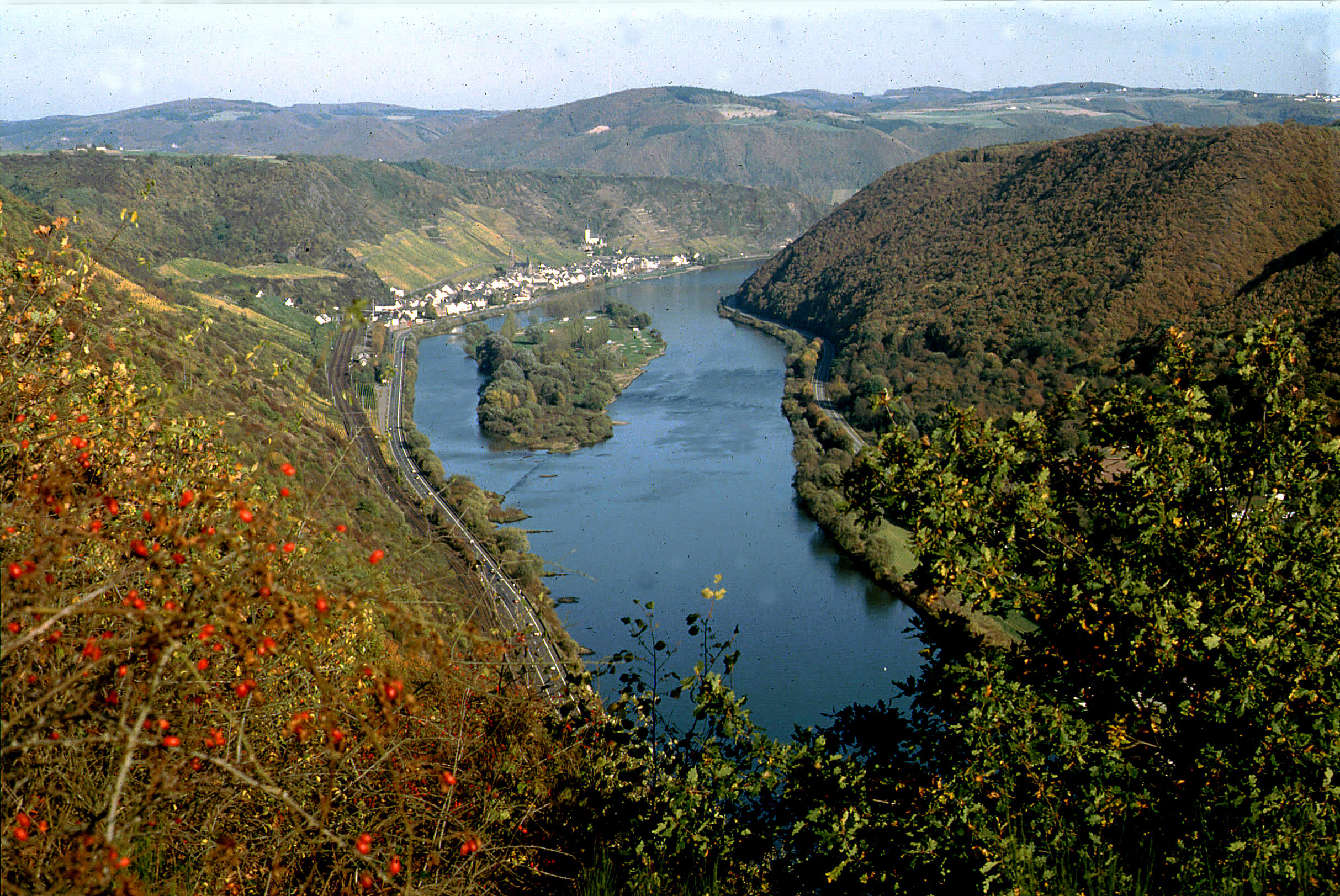
1. Lower Moselle countryside near Hatzenport in October

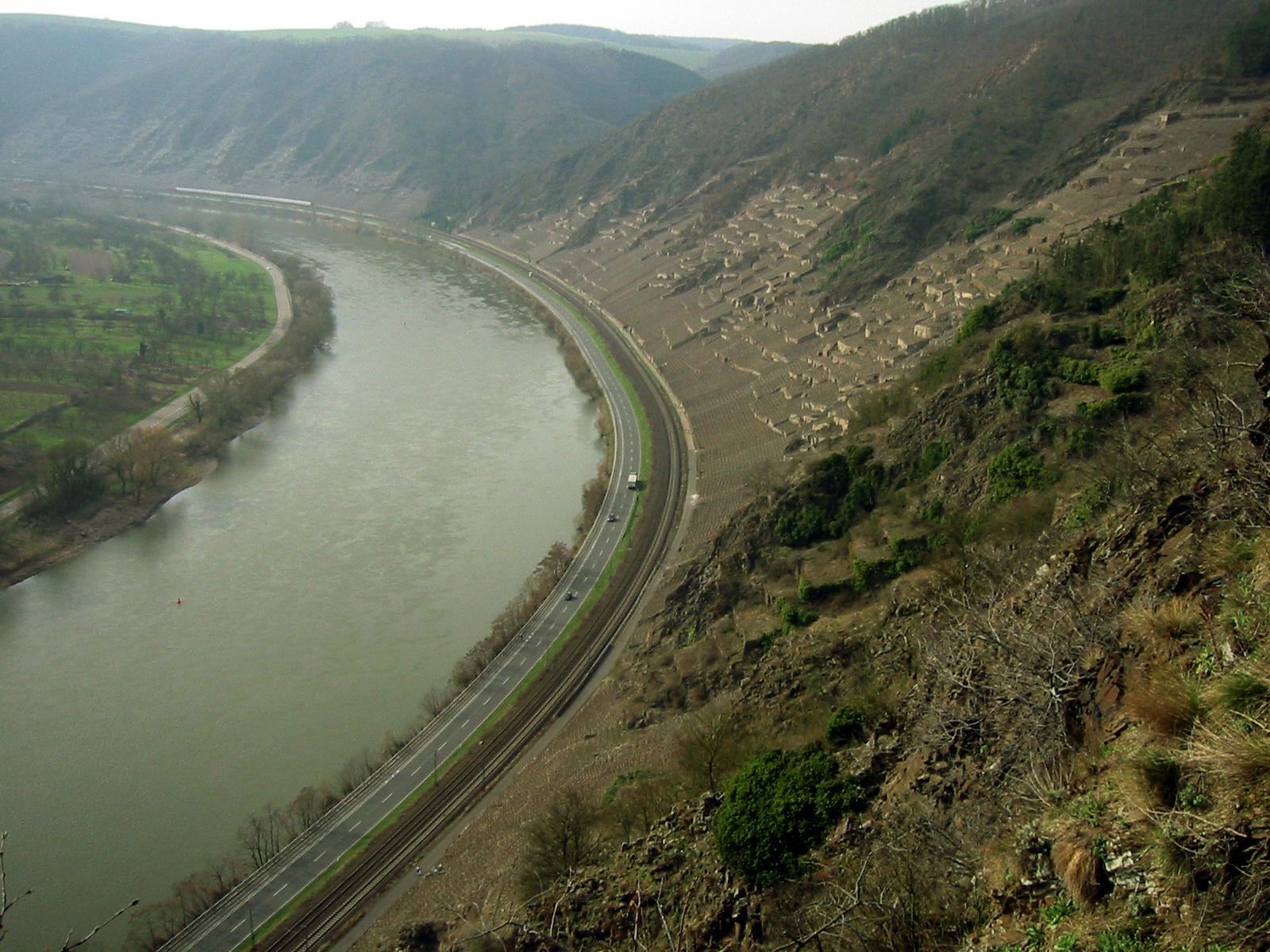
2. Terraced vineyards on the steep hillsides of the Koberner Uhlen (behind) and Winninger Uhlen in March

The Lower Moselle (German: Untermosel or Terrassenmosel) is the name given to the lower reaches of the Moselle river - just under 100 kilometres long - in Germany between Pünderich and the Moselle's confluence with the Rhine at Koblenz. The Lower Moselle landscape differs from that of the Middle and Upper Moselle, much of it forming a narrower valley with high and steep sides in places. On the cut banks of the river that are oriented towards the south and west, vineyards are managed, often on the tiniest, terraced strips of land on steep hillslopes.

The upgrading of the Moselle into a waterway for big ships in the 1960s has permanently changed the appearance of the river and its banks. Five changes of level between Koblenz and Zell in order to build locks for large ships have changed a riverbed that was narrow in places and wide in others with gently sloping banks into a canal-like waterway that is contained by artificial walls and rock embankments in the areas of the locks.

== Geography and boundaries ==
The Lower Moselle begins in the wine village of Pünderich and ends at its confluence in the city of Koblenz where it empties into the Rhine at the Deutsches Eck ("German Corner"). It separates the Central Upland mountain ranges of the Eifel and Hunsrück and flows through the two counties of Cochem-Zell and Mayen-Koblenz in the north of the state of Rhineland-Palatinate. The settlements in the valley are predominantly small villages that increased in area towards the end of the 20th century. Towns with central administrative functions are Zell (pop. in 2009 = 4,200) and Cochem (pop. in 2009 = 4,900). Tourism and winegrowing are important economic factors in this region.

The first division of the river into the Lower and Middle/Upper Moselle may have been a consequence of the foundation of the Roman provinces of Germania superior (Upper Germania) and Gallia Belgica in the 1st century AD. The border between the two administrations crossed the river between the present-day Moselle towns of Traben-Trarbach and Zell. In the Late Middle Ages this line divided the Upper (Obere) and Lower Archdiocese (Untere Erzstift) of the Electorate of Trier. From 1798 to 1814 it formed the boundary between the French departements of Saar and Rhine and Moselle, from 1824 to 1999 the provinces of Koblenz and Trier. It is also where the line of 50° latitude runs, which was often seen as a critical boundary for winegrowing in northern countries. Biologists see in the Mediterranean fauna of the microclimatically favourable southern hillsides of the Moselle valley the markings of a northern boundary of the Mediterranean region. The state wine authorities call the Lower Moselle the Burg Cochem Wine Area (Weinbaubereich Burg Cochem).

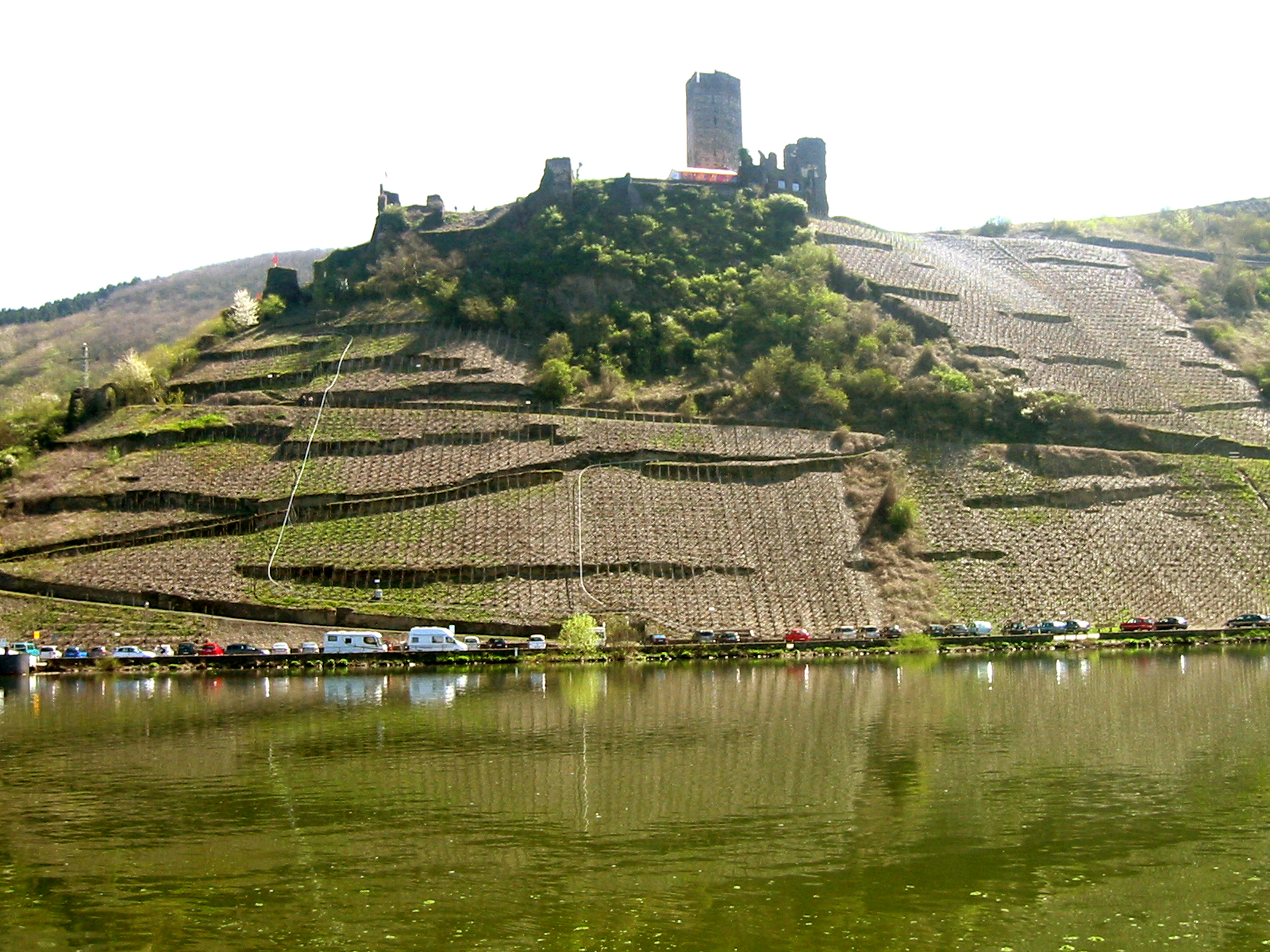
3. Old terraces below a medieval castle: the ruins of Metternich with the Beilsteiner Schlossberg hillside

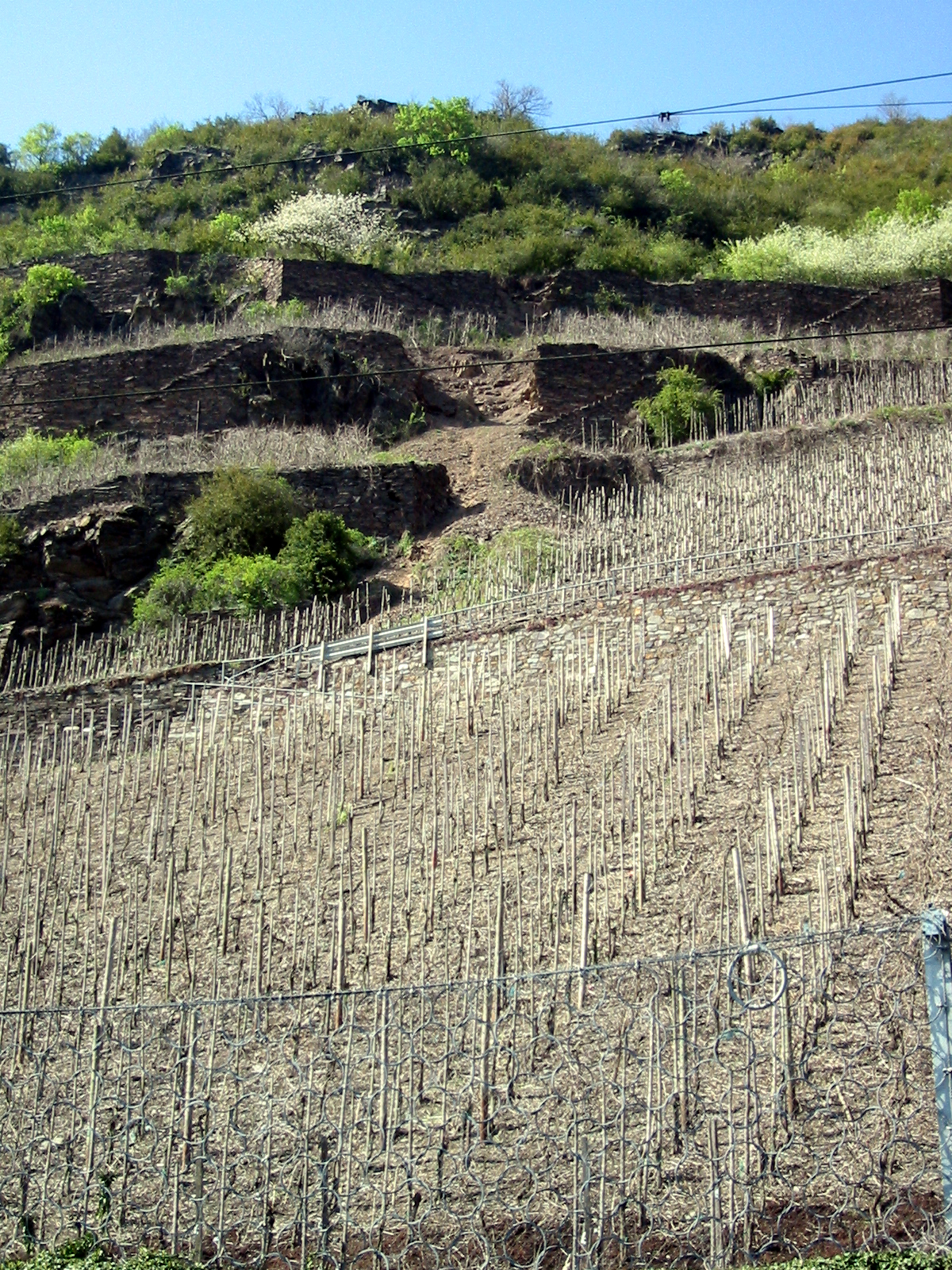
4. Traditional post planting on the lower slope. The upper terraces have been left fallow. Kardener Dechantsberg

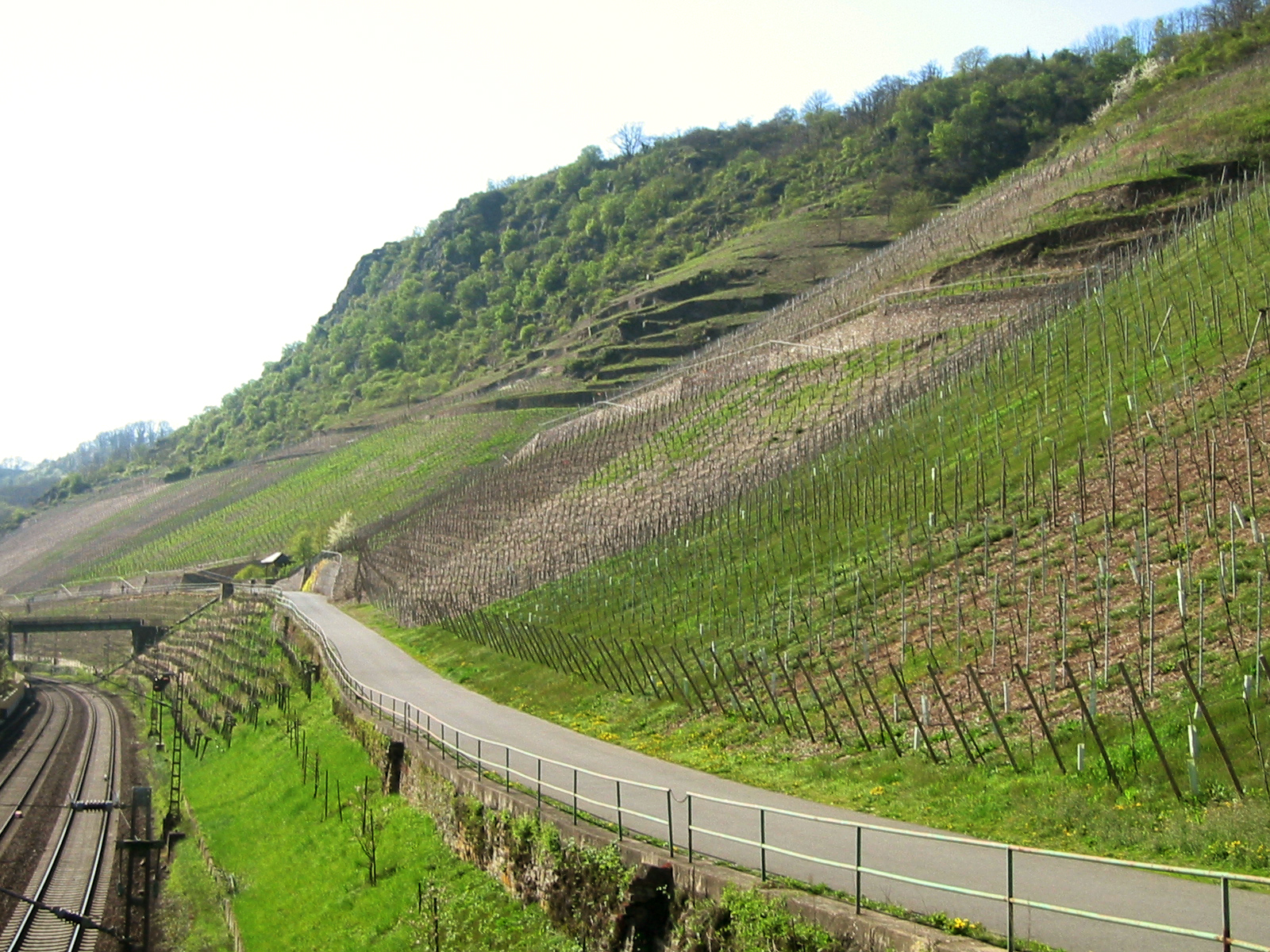
5. New vineyards with trellis wire fences after the old terraces were cleared in Hatzenporter Kirchberg

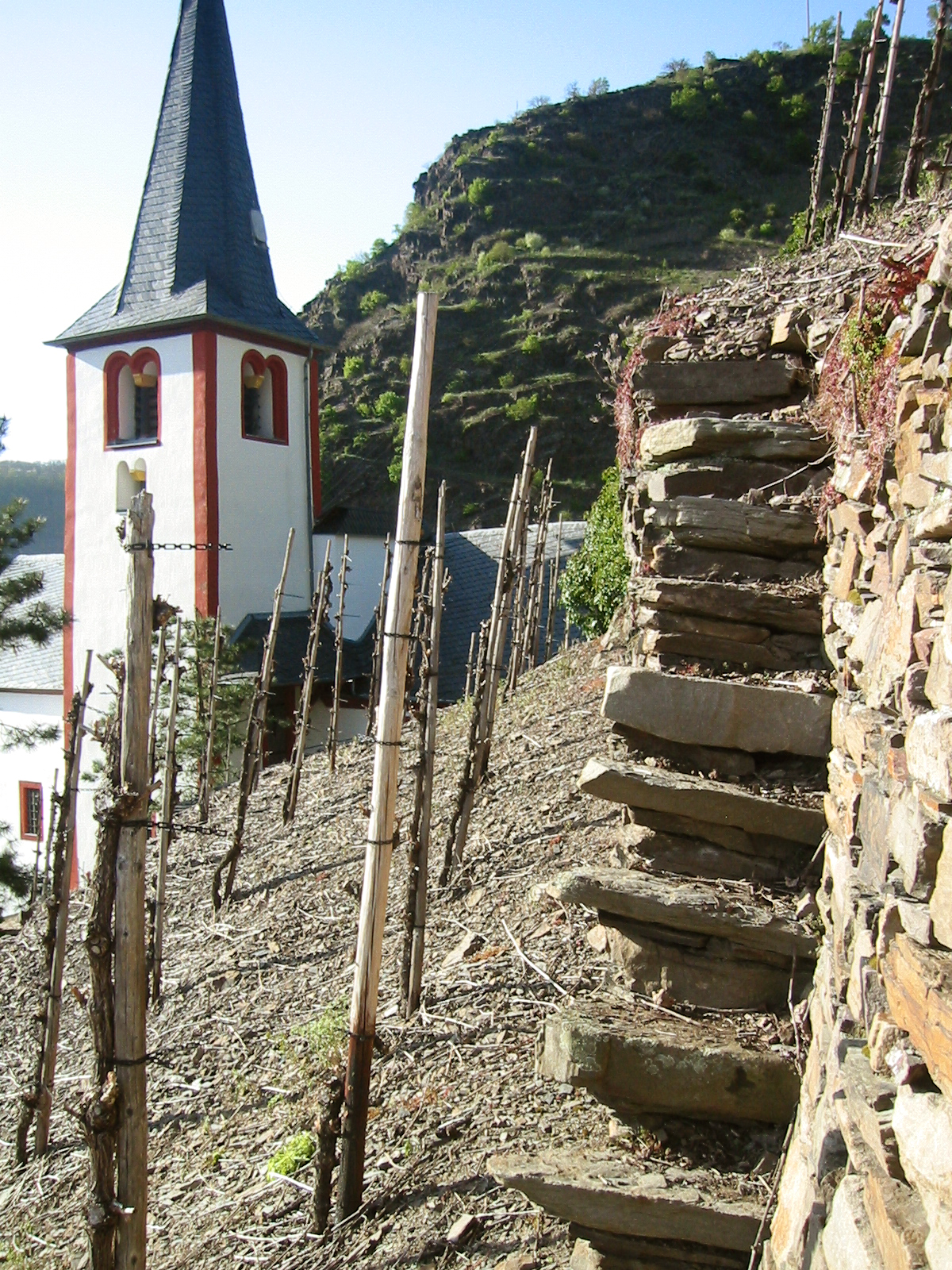
6. Terraces in the old part of the Alkener Burgberg

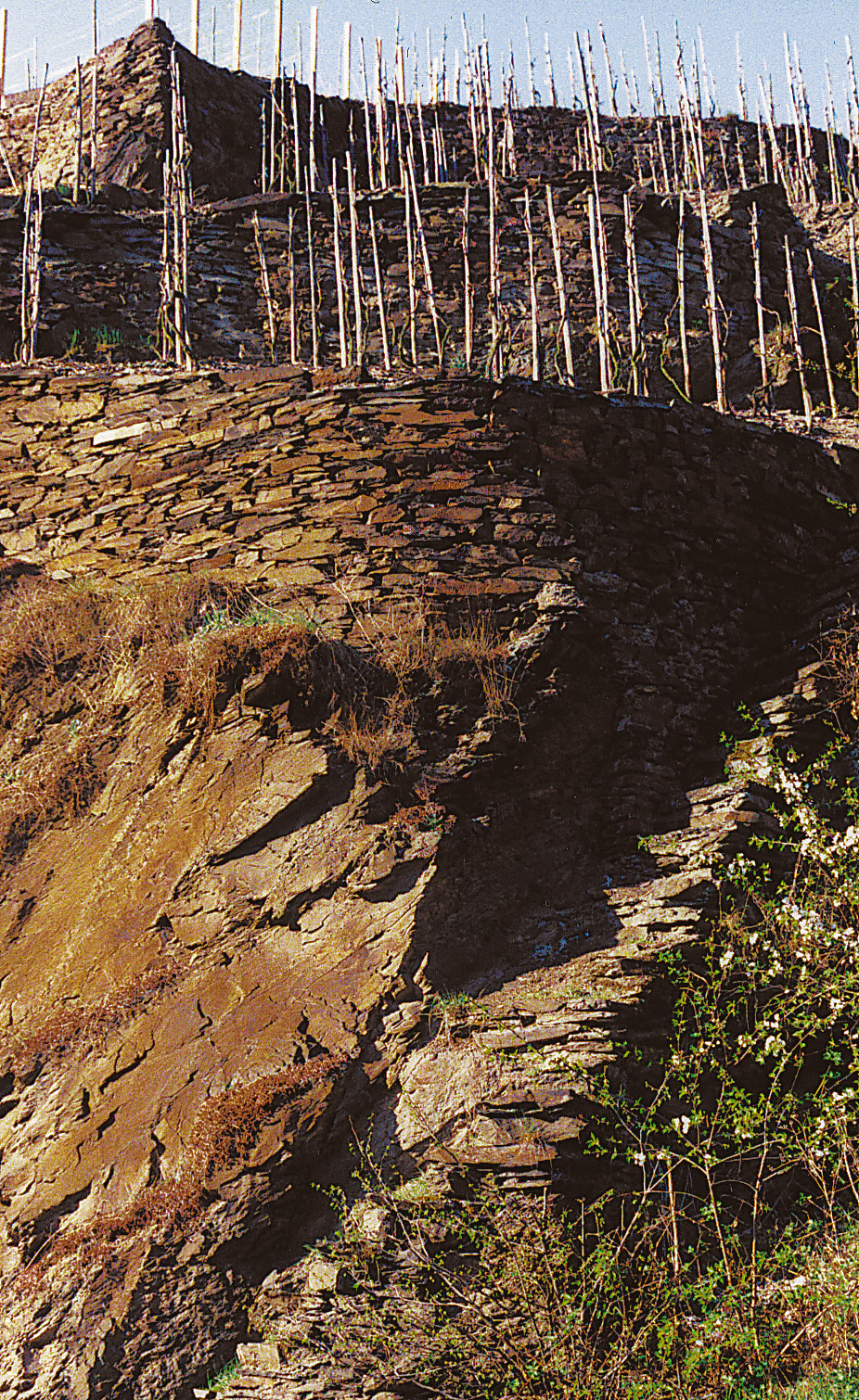
7. Old, rounded dry stone wall on rock base: Koberner Schlossberg below the Late Romanesque chapel

== Geology and history ==
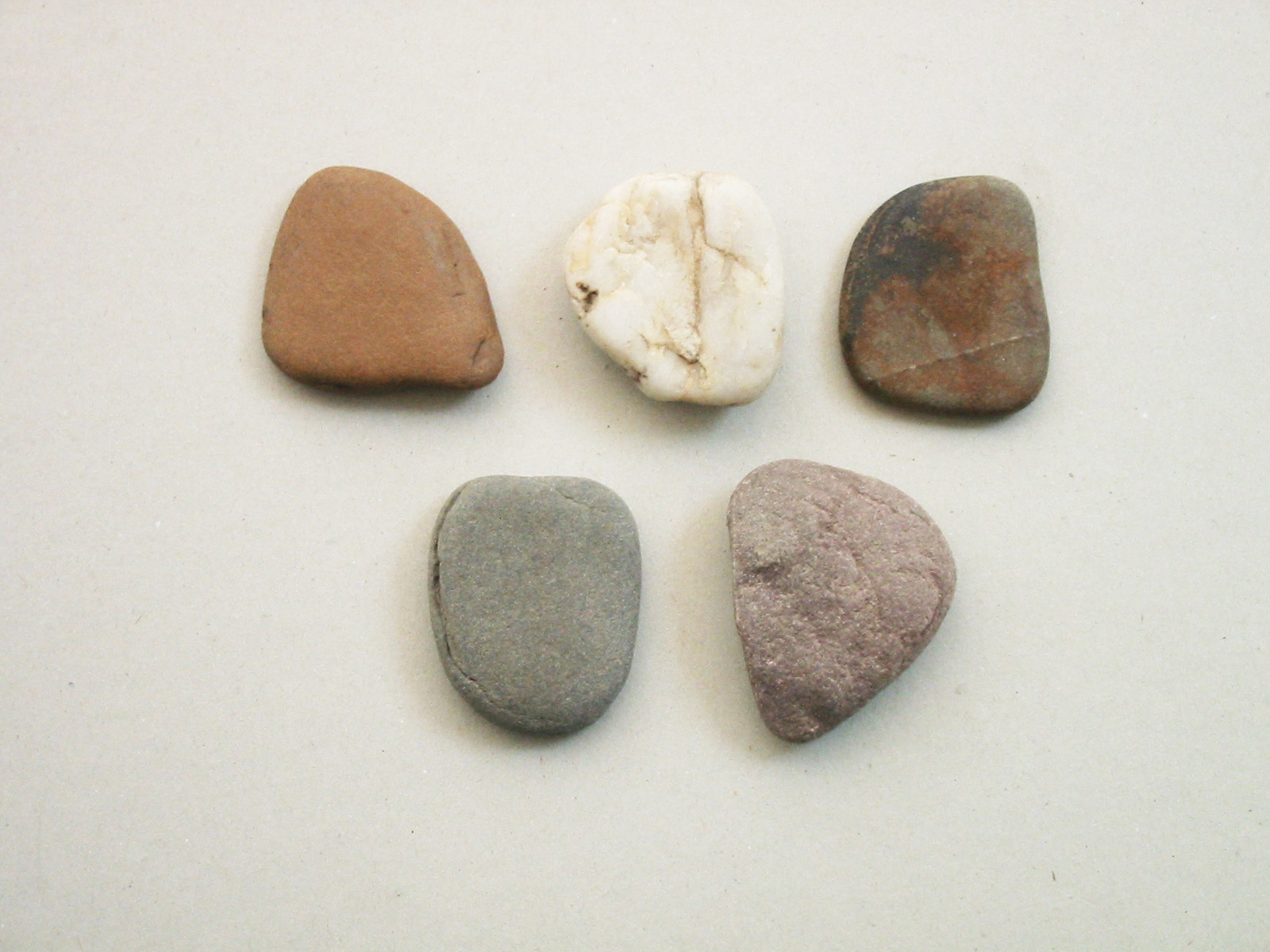
8. Moselle Gravel from the riverbank: Above l to r Red sandstone, quartzite, slate. Below l to r Slate, sandstone with quartz attached

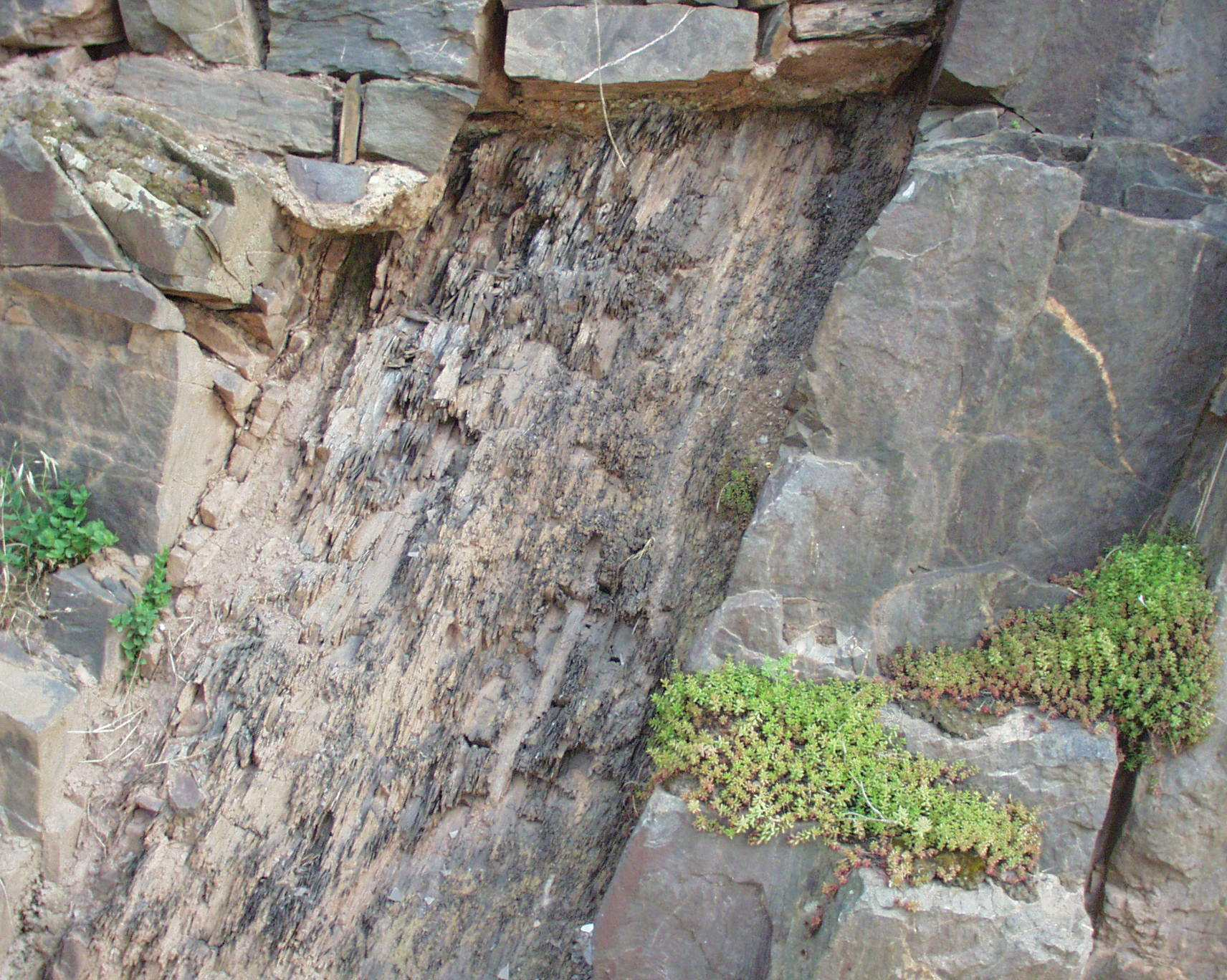
9. An example of an unstable wall foundation as a result of variable rock weathering: soft shale between harder grauwacke. Site: Ediger Elzhofberg. Photo Bernd Ternes

The hillsides of the Lower Moselle, with their strikingly varied types of rock and rock formations, bear witness to the end of a development phase in the earth's history in the Moselle area, which began about 390 million years ago in the Lower Devonian. At that time there was a shallow sea in this region that was bounded in the north by the Old Red Continent and in the south by the island structures of the Central German Uplands. From these land masses sediments washed into the slowly sinking shallow sea over millions of years thus forming a thick bed of rock unit with a thickness of up to 14 kilometres, which geologists call the Moselle Trough (Moseltrog). Subsequently, these deposits were solidified through folding, pressure and heat into rock masses of varying stability (cleavage takes place at 250°–400 °C, silicic acid, i.e.quartz, can be mobilised at 300 °C). Most of this development took place in the Carboniferous period, 350 million years ago, when the Rhenish Massif was uplifted and folded.

The shaping of the present Moselle landscape began in the Tertiary period. The water of the later Moselle initially washed through a wide, flat valley in a still relatively gently rolling hill country. In the last 500,000 years the Rhenish Massif continued to be uplifted, so that the Moselle cut deeply into the rock masses.

Until the middle of the 20th century, the settlement of this cultural landscape of small, closely built villages surrounded by orchards and gardens and terraced vineyards, only changed slowly. Today many of the former orchard fields lie fallow or have fallen victim to development as villages have grown, to industrial estates and roads, but also large-scale, consolidated vineyards. On the hillsides many old terrace walls have been demolished and levelled in order to simplify farming and construct farm tracks. The impression of a historically evolved, terraced, cultural landscape is thus quite a rare sight in several sections of the valley. With the aid of predominantly publicly funded job creation schemes, overgrown terraces that had run wild have had their vegetation removed in several places in order to preserve the picture of a cultural landscape created by man as well as the biotope of very sunny terraces. The digging up and removal of vines from abandoned sites is also required in order to prevent the spread of plant diseases such as grape black rot or phylloxera.

Abandoned vineyards are a consequence of the structural changes in viticulture, whereby small businesses, especially those which only marketed cask wine, are closed on economic grounds or as a result of a lack of successors or, where vineyards on steep slopes are abandoned in favour of only gently sloping and consolidated sites.

From 1999 to 2009 the area of steep hillside being used for viticulture reduced from 998 ha to 764 ha. By contrast, the recultivation of older sites, that as early as the Napoleonic and royal Prussian eras were valued and mapped due to their above-average land prices. Many of these sites are stand out due to the unusual stock of vines and wider terraces; instead of the closely spaced individual stakes with the traditional curvature, new vines are increasingly trained using espalier wires and are spaced more widely apart. In the Moselweisser Hamm area, shortly before Koblenz, the recultivation and terracing of old vineyards was carried out using sloping, grassed embankments instead of stone walls. (Fig. 11).

Villages with extensive vineyards are, in the county of Cochem-Zell: Pünderich, Briedel, Kaimt, Merl, St. Aldegund, Neef, Bremm, Eller, Ediger, Senheim, Bruttig-Fankel, Ellenz-Poltersdorf, Ernst, Valwig, Klotten, Pommern, Treis-Karden, Müden and Moselkern.

In Mayen-Koblenz: Hatzenport, Alken, Lehmen, Niederfell, Kobern-Gondorf and Winningen. Lay, Moselweiss and Güls are within the municipal area of Koblenz.

The geographical term, Lower Moselle, covers the areas known for tourism reasons as Zeller Land (region of the collective municipality of Zell between Pünderich and Neef including the villages on the Hunsrück), and Ferienland Cochem ("Cochem Holiday Country"), the region of the collective municipality of Cochem) between Bremm and Klotten.

The Calmont vineyard in Bremm and Eller (the steepest in Europe), the Valwiger Herrenberg and the Kobern-Winninger Uhlen etc. are among the steepest terraced vineyards on the Moselle. In 2003, the Association of German Prädikat Wine Estates (Verband Deutscher Prädikatsweingüter, VDP), following the vineyard assessments of the Vineyard Map for the Province of Koblenz of 1897 (Weinbaukarte für den Regierungsbezirk Koblenz von 1897), assessed specific plots in the areas of Marienburg and Nonnenberg in Pünderich, Kirchberg and Stolzenberg in Hatzenport and Uhlen and Röttgen in Winningen as "First Class". The classification is only carried out for those vineyards that are managed by members of the VDP. Other sites are not assessed by the VDP.

The most popular grape variety grown in the Lower Moselle is the Riesling with 59.7% of the total. It is followed by the Pinot Blanc (12.6%) and the Pinot Noir (5.5%), some way behind, but on the increase.

The landscape with the terraced vineyards on extremely steep slopes on the valley sides of the Moselle has been referred to since the end of the 20th century as the Terrassenmosel (lit.: "Terrace Moselle"), a wine industry and tourist label. It was introduced by the Winningen vintner, Winzer Reinhard Löwenstein. This description caught on due to the features of the countryside with its very steep vineyards, a unique element even when compared with other regions, e.g. the neighbouring Middle Moselle. Both tourist and wine marketing organisations use the term Terrassenmosel instead of Untermosel ("Lower Moselle") for their own identity and manufacturing purposes.

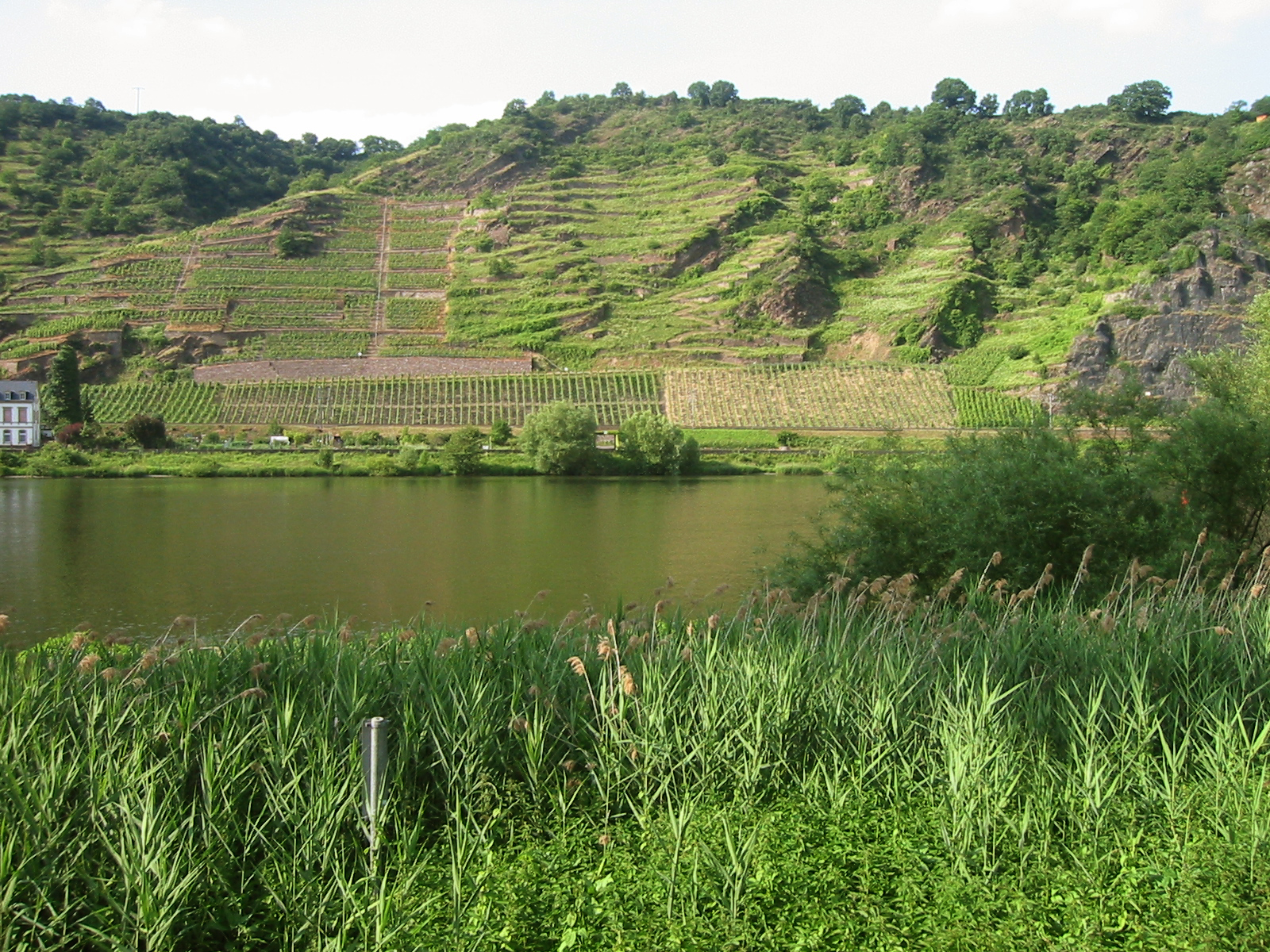
10. Managed terraces next to fallow ones in especially steep and small plots: Hatzenporter Stolzenberg

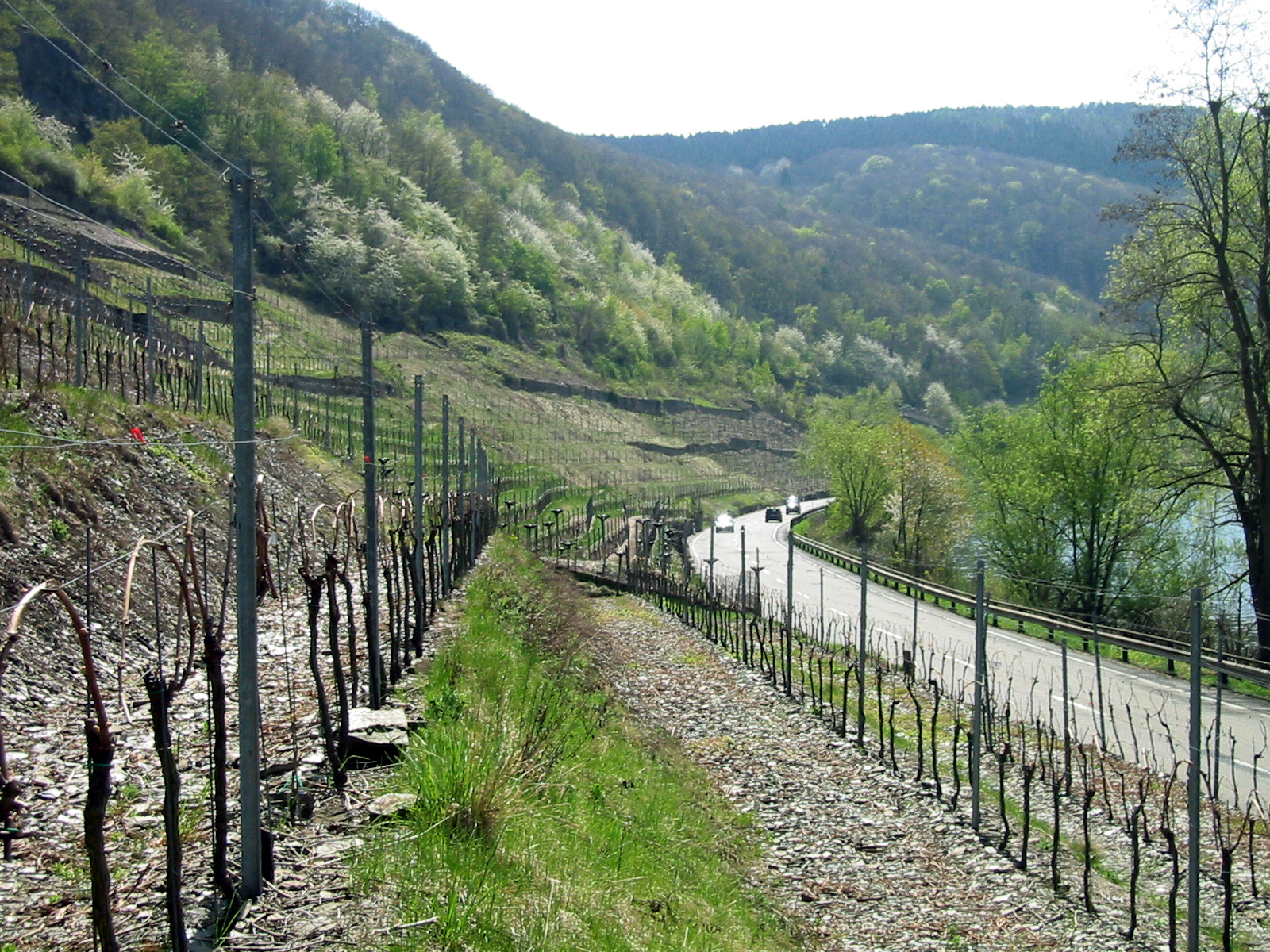
11. New terraces and diagonally running planting on espalier wires: Moselweisser Hamm

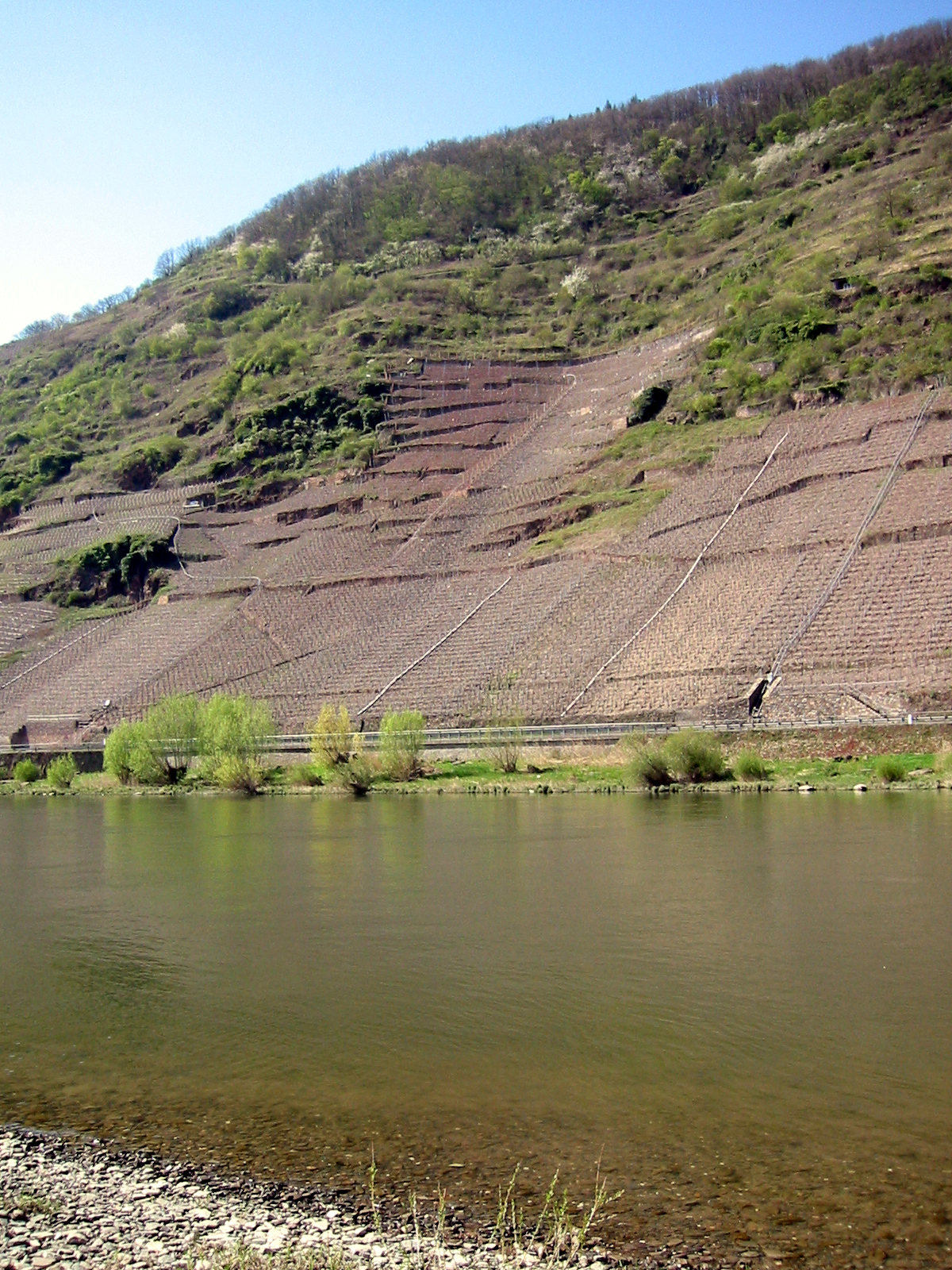
12. New plantings on the old steep hillside: Valwiger Herrenberg

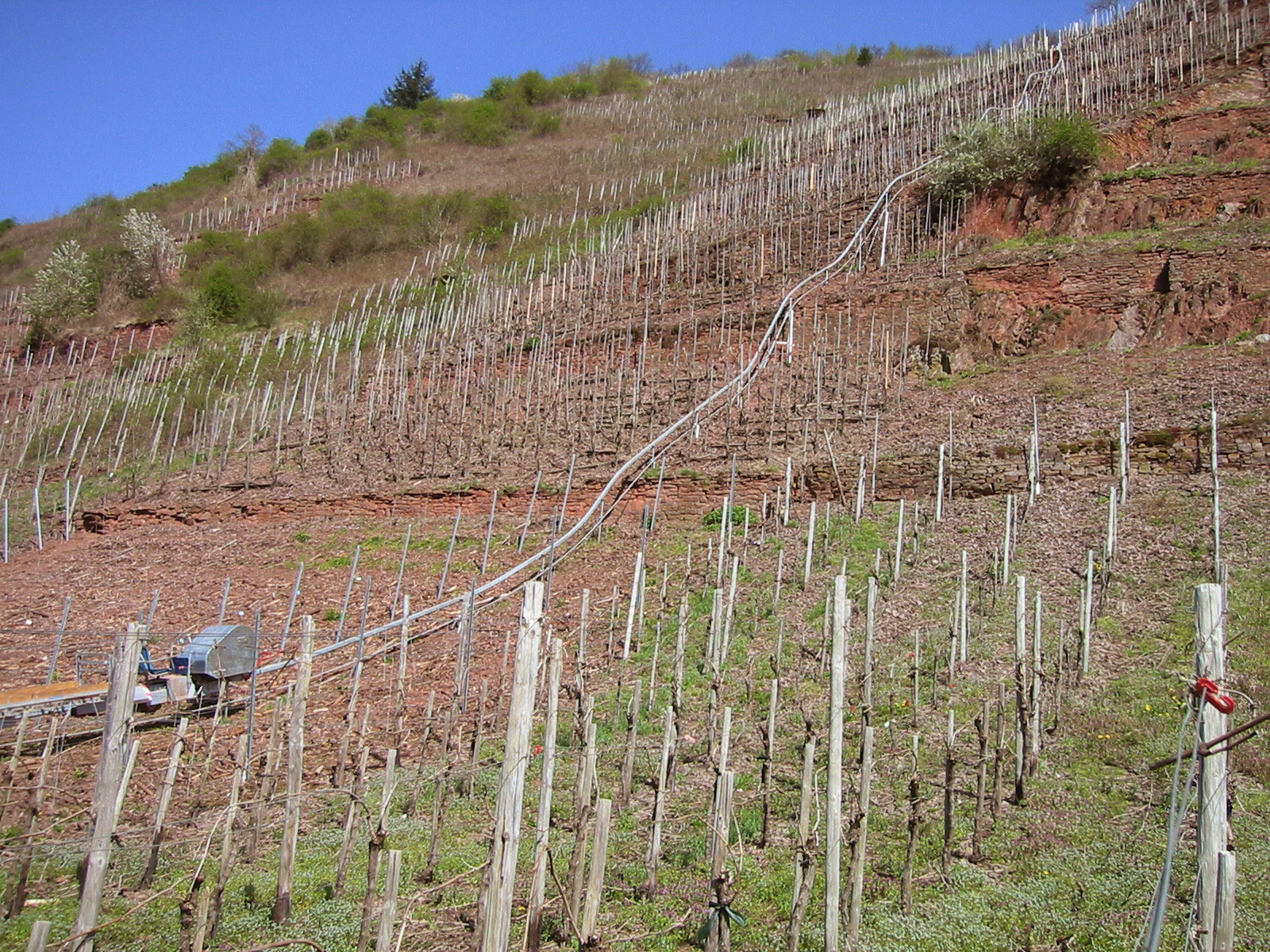
13. Without the monorack railway the old steep locations would not have been recultivated: Ediger Elzhofberg

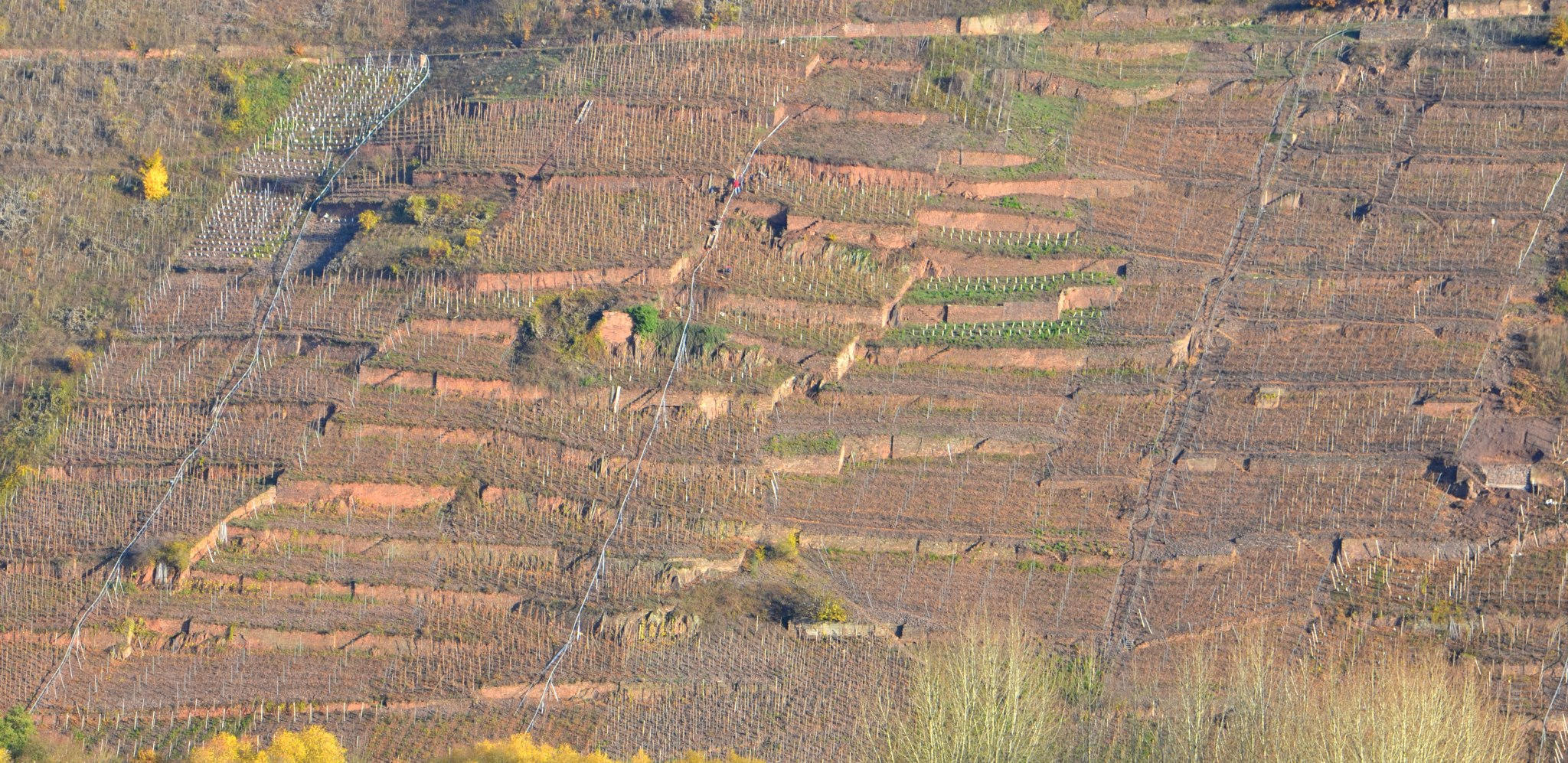
13a. Several monorack railways on steep slopes near Ediger-Eller.

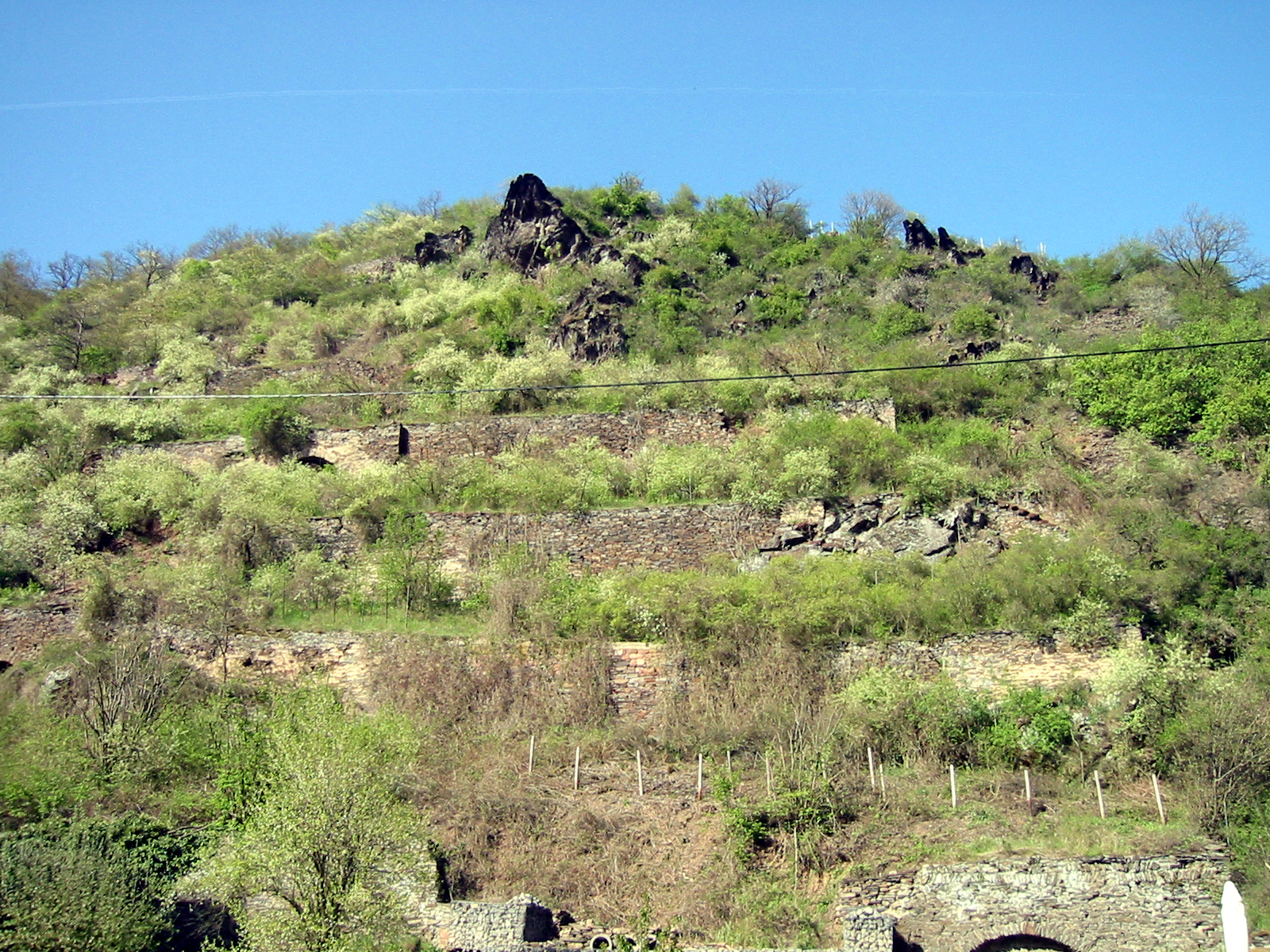
14. Abandoned since the mid-20th century: Gondorfer Fuchshöhle in a side valley of the Moselle near Kobern-Gondorf.

== Development of terracing on the Lower Moselle ==
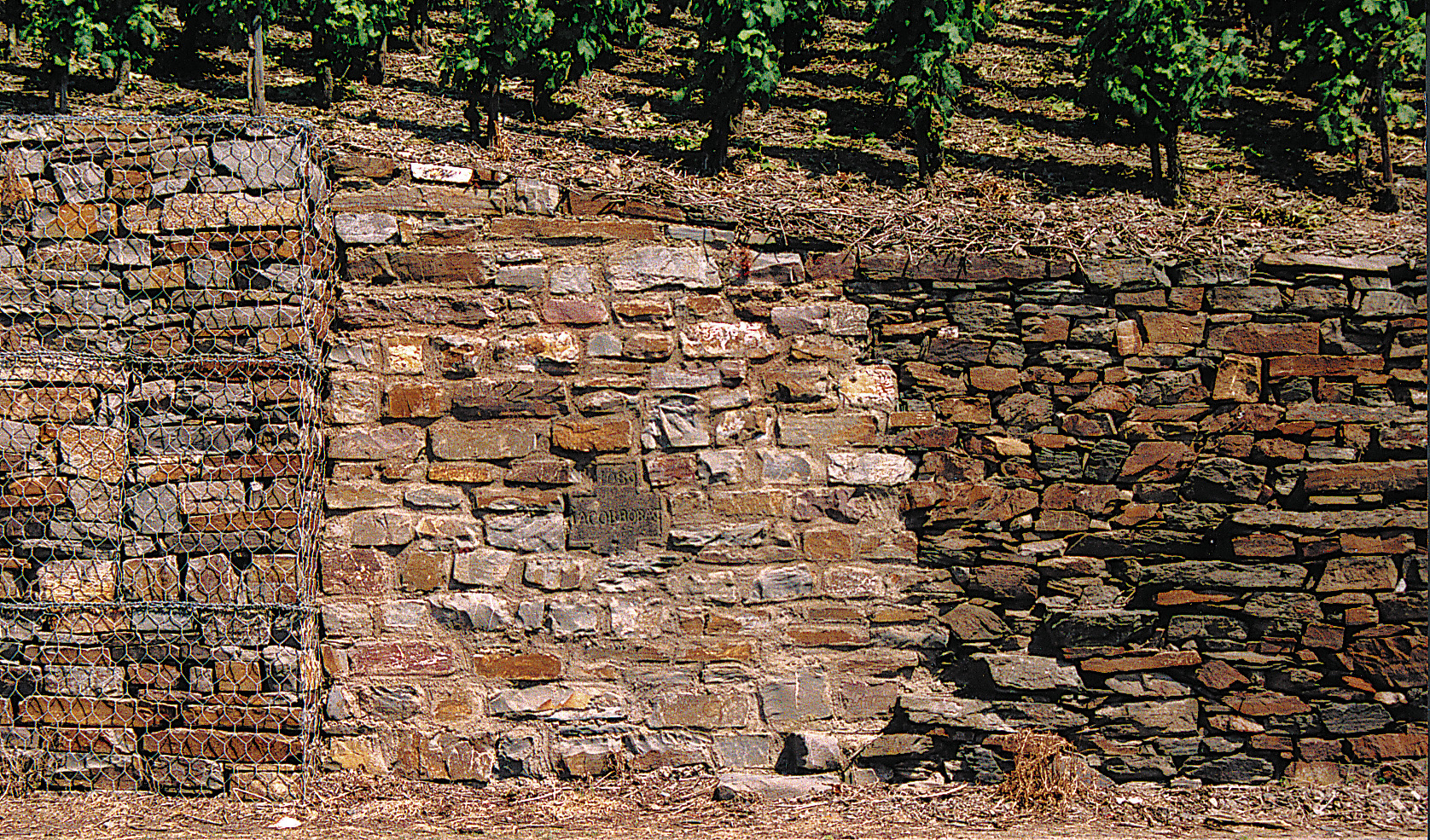
15. Reconstruction of an old terrace wall: l. to r. Gabions (rubblestone in wire baskets), mortared wall with new rubble stones, surviving section of dry stone wall from the rocks of the same hillside: Niederfeller Kahllay

In the late 1970s, archaeologists discovered the first evidence of possible Roman terracing on the hillsides of the Moselle valley: Land consolidation and the laying out of new farm tracks in vineyards on the Middle Moselle and the upper Lower Moselle exposed the foundations of ancient Celtic houses at the foot of the hillsides. The archaeological sites on the steep hillsides still being managed today could therefore be viewed as evidence of Roman terracing on these slopes in the 3rd century AD.

No such finds were made between Cochem and Koblenz. The reason for that could be – despite much evidence of Gallo-Roman settlement – a possibly lower level of population, but also the construction of railways and roads in the late 19th century meant that the many vineyards at the foot of old hillside sites in e. g. Hatzenport, Karden, Kobern or Winningen were swept away; possible clues for ancient Celtic sites could thus have been lost without anyone realising. For the late 6th century AD, however, there are written accounts of the early cultivation of steep hillsides for winegrowing in a record of a journey on the Moselle by the ancient writer, Venantius Fortunatus: … where leafy vineyards soar up to bare hill tops / and rich shady leaves cover the dry gravel / here the harvest collects the coloured grapes of the vintners / even on the rocky slope he picks the fruit.

The demise of Roman civilisation and changes in population during the Migration Period probably left viticulture on the Lower Moselle largely undisturbed. Laws passed by the Frankish kings protected the old established winemakers. For example, there were islands of settlement here until the High Middle Ages in which Moselle Roman was spoken instead of a Frankish language. The still commonly used dialect word for a vineyard terrace - Chur or Kuur (plural: Chuer, Kuure), derived from cura (Latin for "care") or chorus (Latin for the raised altar area of a church).

From the 9th century there is a rich record of viniculture for almost all villages on the Lower Moselle. (e. g. Ediger in the year 766, Kobern in 817, Bruttig in 898). Many vineyards were probably still on the level or lower hillsides. The High Middle Ages was the epoch when manual labourers began to build stable terrace walls - based on skills learned in constructing castles in challenging engineering situations on rocky ridges and above steep precipices. The terrace walls were probably mainly of dry stone construction because the amount of mortar required for the irregular rubble stone used would just have been too expensive. Around 30 per cent of the construction costs were estimated by Archbishop Balduin to have been consumed by the firing and transport of the necessary lime for mortar and plaster of his castles in the Middle Rhine-Lower Moselle area. (figs. 16 and 17).

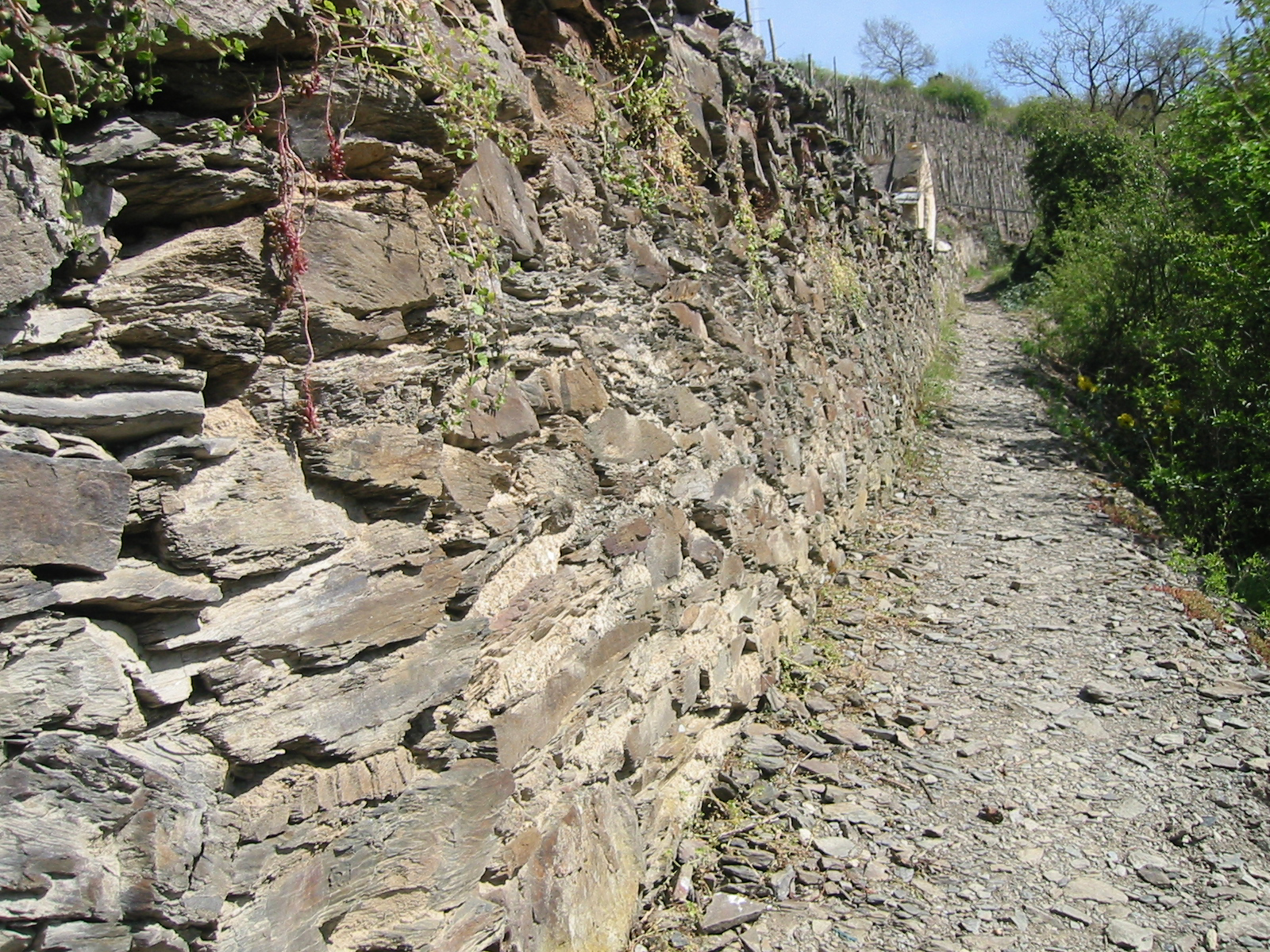
16. A mortared wall that may have been built in the Middle Ages, next to a footpath to the castle's lower ward. Koberner Schlossberg

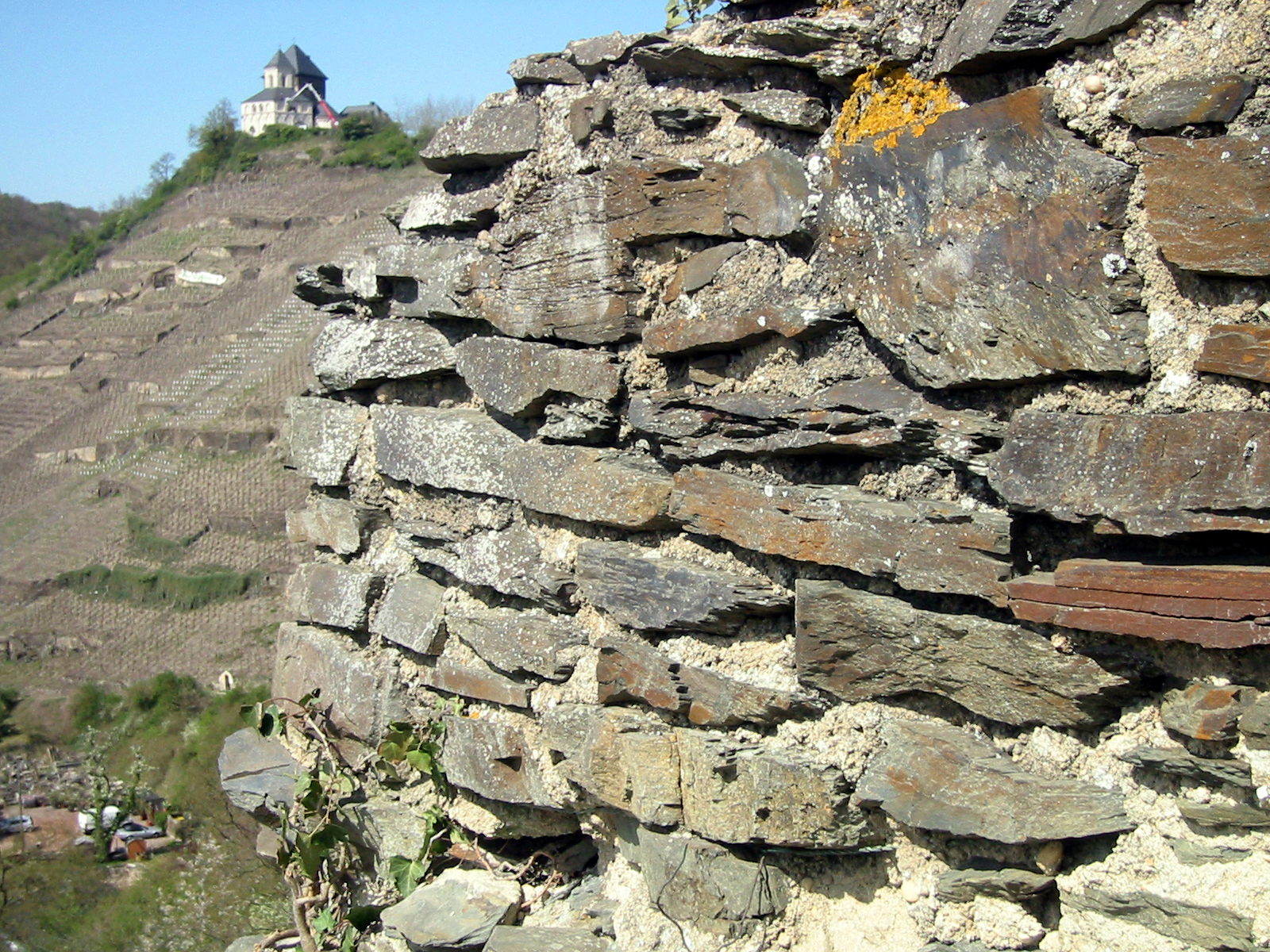
17. Detail of the mortared shield wall of the lower ward from the 12th century. Behind: the Late Romanesque St. Matthias' Chapel

The rise in population in the Middle Ages, the demand of the trading centres of Cologne, present-day Belgium and the Netherlands and the, compared with today, high per-capita consumption of wine must have led to an expansion of the winegrowing areas and associated terracing needed. In deeds of ownership and enfeoffment of the time there are even sites managed today that could have been terraced as early as the 12th century. Gepirg pringt edlern wein ("steep slopes produce better wine") was an adage recorded in a farming guide of the 14th century. Gebirge or Gepirg was the name given to steep locations on the valley sides until the 19th century. Phases of closure, abandonment and ruination of terraces followed plagues, war or climatic changes.

In the late 19th century the terracing of valley sides along the Lower Moselle – occasionally almost to the hilltops – probably reached its greatest extent. The successive terracing uphill also occurred especially in the terroirs, which from the earliest times were known for highly sought after wines that commanded high prices. In order to produce greater quantities, terraces were also laid in the side valleys and on less favourable sites. Around 1880 the Province of Koblenz still named around 2,500 hectares of vineyard land, mainly on steep hillsides.

From the mid-20th century production on the terraced vineyards of the steep hillsides of the Lower Moselle stagnated. The sites that were difficult to access and could only be managed by hand became overgrown and scrubby; many walls collapsed. In the 1960s and 1970s the smaller, less steep areas began to be consolidated into larger vineyards. This enabled them to be farmed more economically using machines, thus reducing the manpower needed and the cost. However, it meant the levelling of many, formerly terraced slopes and the demolition of many vineyard walls that were important for the ecology and the appearance of the countryside (Figs.30-33).

Aid from the public sector, funding from national and European budgets, and in particular the installation of monorack railways developed in Switzerland for steep slopes, that simplified the mechanical transport of men and materials, are now preventing some sites from falling into decay. (Figs. 13 and 13a).

=== Shape and significance of vineyard terraces ===
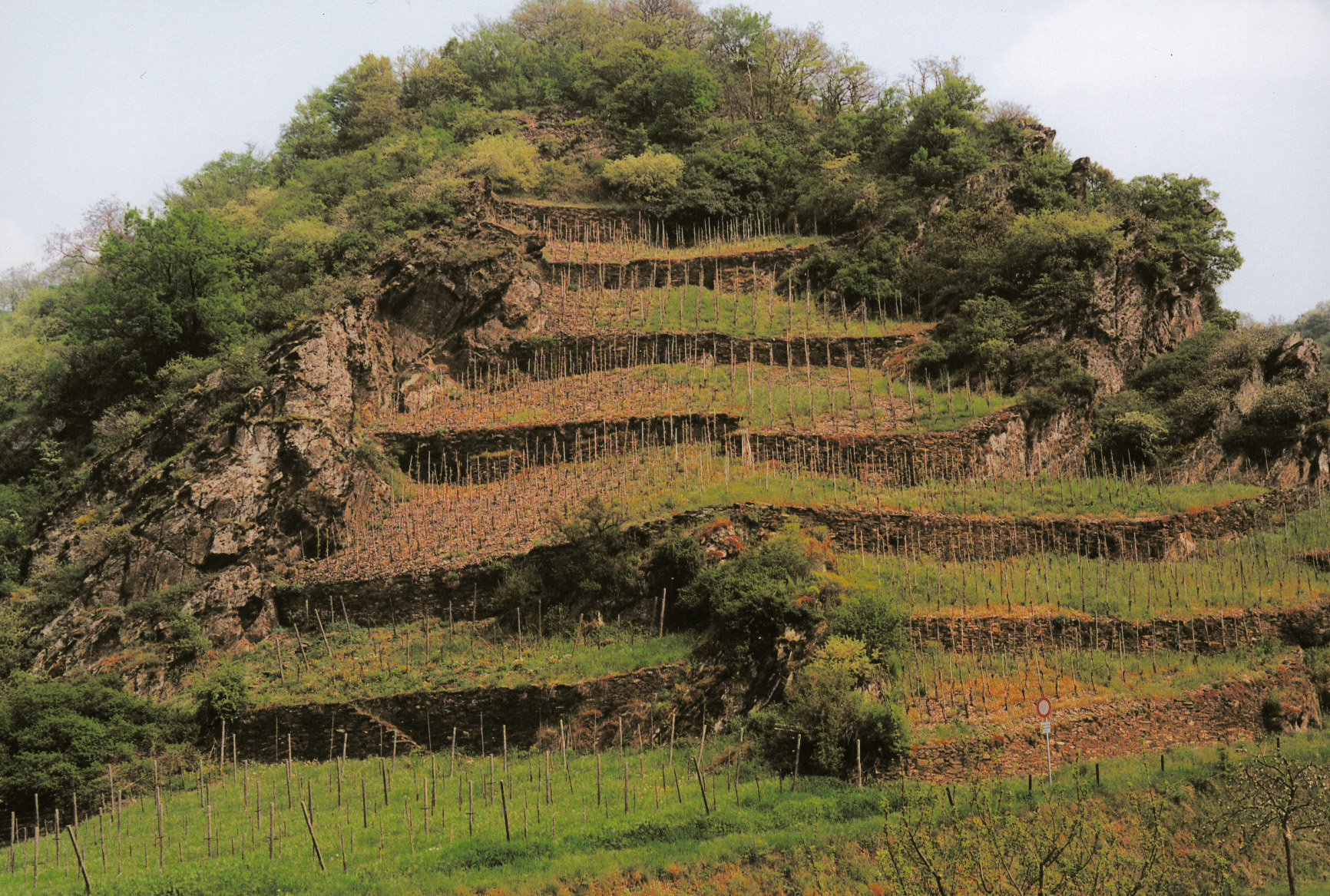
18. Old terraced vineyard Fächern in Niederfell, formerly called Grub.

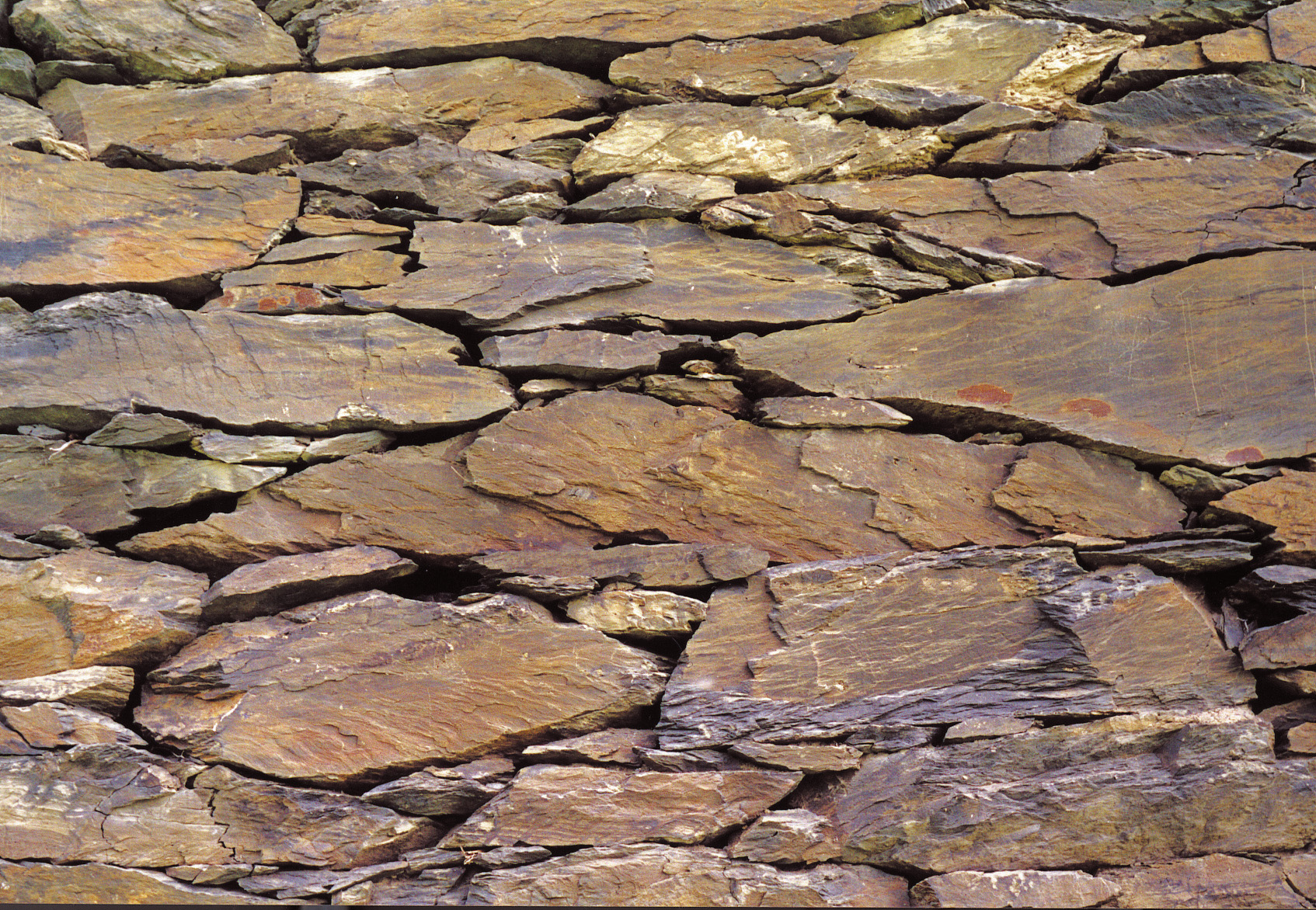
19. Detail of an old dry stone wall, made of rubble stone from the Fächern.

The advantages of slope terracing to increase the area available for cultivation were mentioned in ancient Roman agricultural instruction books (e.g. Junius Moderatus Columella around 60 AD in De re rustica).

A description of terrace building on the Moselle has been handed down by a Baden oenologist from the 19th century, describing a technique that was probably used even in Roman times: "Because all hillsides are rocky by nature and there is little space for building in the open areas between the rocks, the whole terrace has to be dug out to the specified depth. To do this, rocks are broken off and split; those pieces that are not left to weather and break up in the open air, become stones used for the terraces (Figs. 18 and 19). Thus one terrace is formed around another until the entire plot is created."

High terrace walls are often mortared for better stability. Today, new walls are built for landscape conservation reasons of stone from local quarries. Wall depths and foundations are based on the planned height. Walls two metres high are - if not on bedrock - built on very large stones, or on a concrete foundation of 100 cm × 60 cm depth and height. An uphill oriented gradient to help stabilise the wall can be achieved by angled construction, or the stacking of stones that are repeatedly set back from the bottom upwards. The stones are set alternately 2 to 1 and 1 to 2 and each lies on at least 3 points of its surface. For one cubic metre of wall around two tons of stone has to be used.

The terraces are, in addition to their agricultural engineering significance, examples of great cultural historical value, their organisation and often masterful architecture witnessing as far back as the Middle Ages. The small scale structure of the plots forms protective barriers against plant disease and provides habitats for a variety of warmth-loving flora and fauna. The Apollo butterfly, the green lizard, the wallflower and rock bunting are only the best known representatives of the ecosystem of the Terraced Moselle that have been recorded in the case studies of small animals and plants of the region.

=== Terrace wall "images" ===
Strikingly carefully built and stable walls are referred to as a "beautiful mural" (schönen Mauerbild). The building of a vineyard wall is today, especially in the larger wineries, carried out by specialist stonemasons. Until the mid-20th century, when the Lower Moselle winegrowing holdings were mostly run by small family farms, each vintner had to be able to construct a wall himself and, in particular, to carry out the repair of collapsed sections of wall.

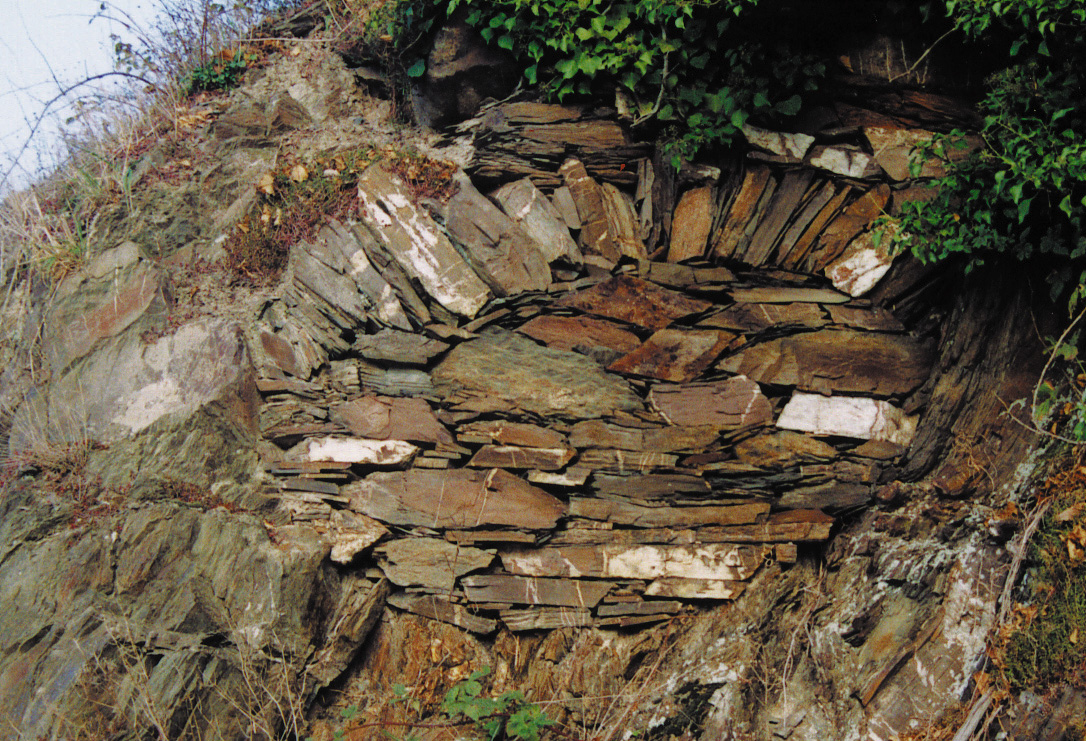
20. Built in a circle for greater terrace stability. Niederfeller Kahllay

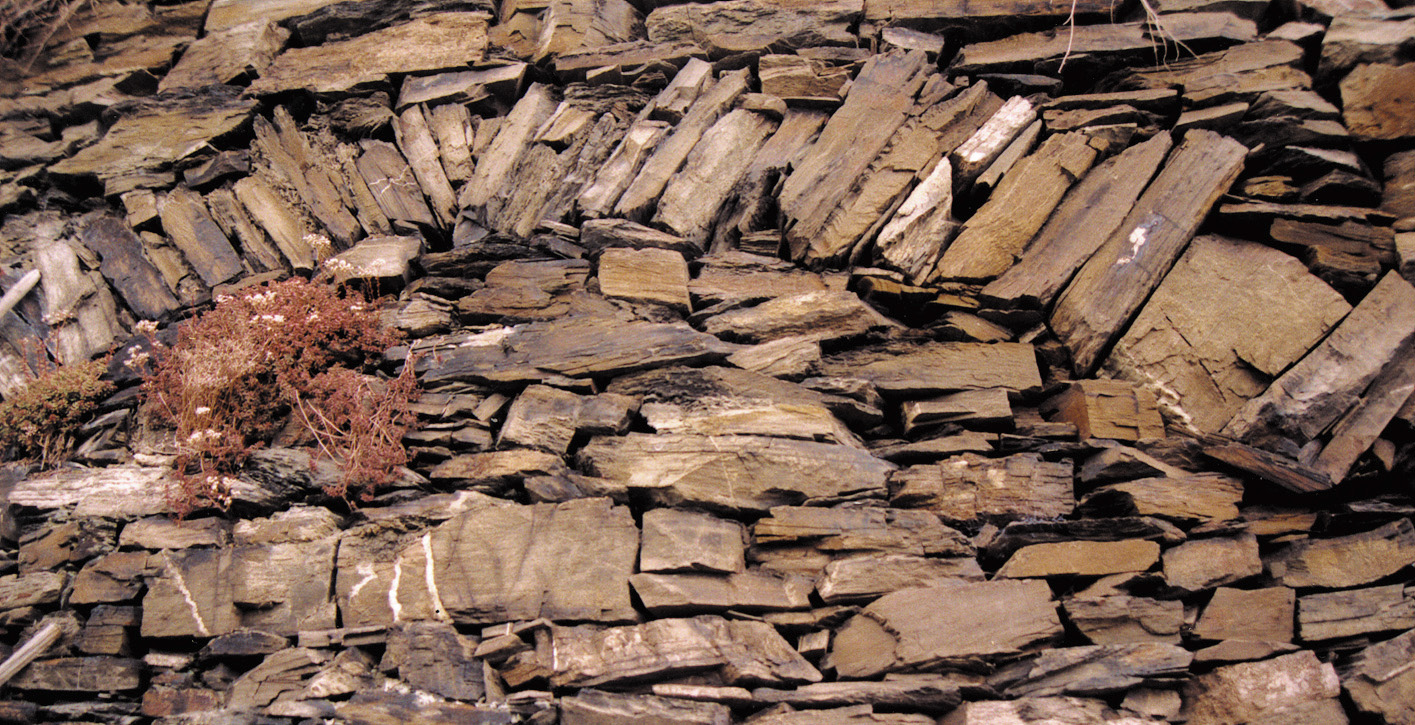
21. Very old curved section in a dry stone wall. Koberner Weissenberg

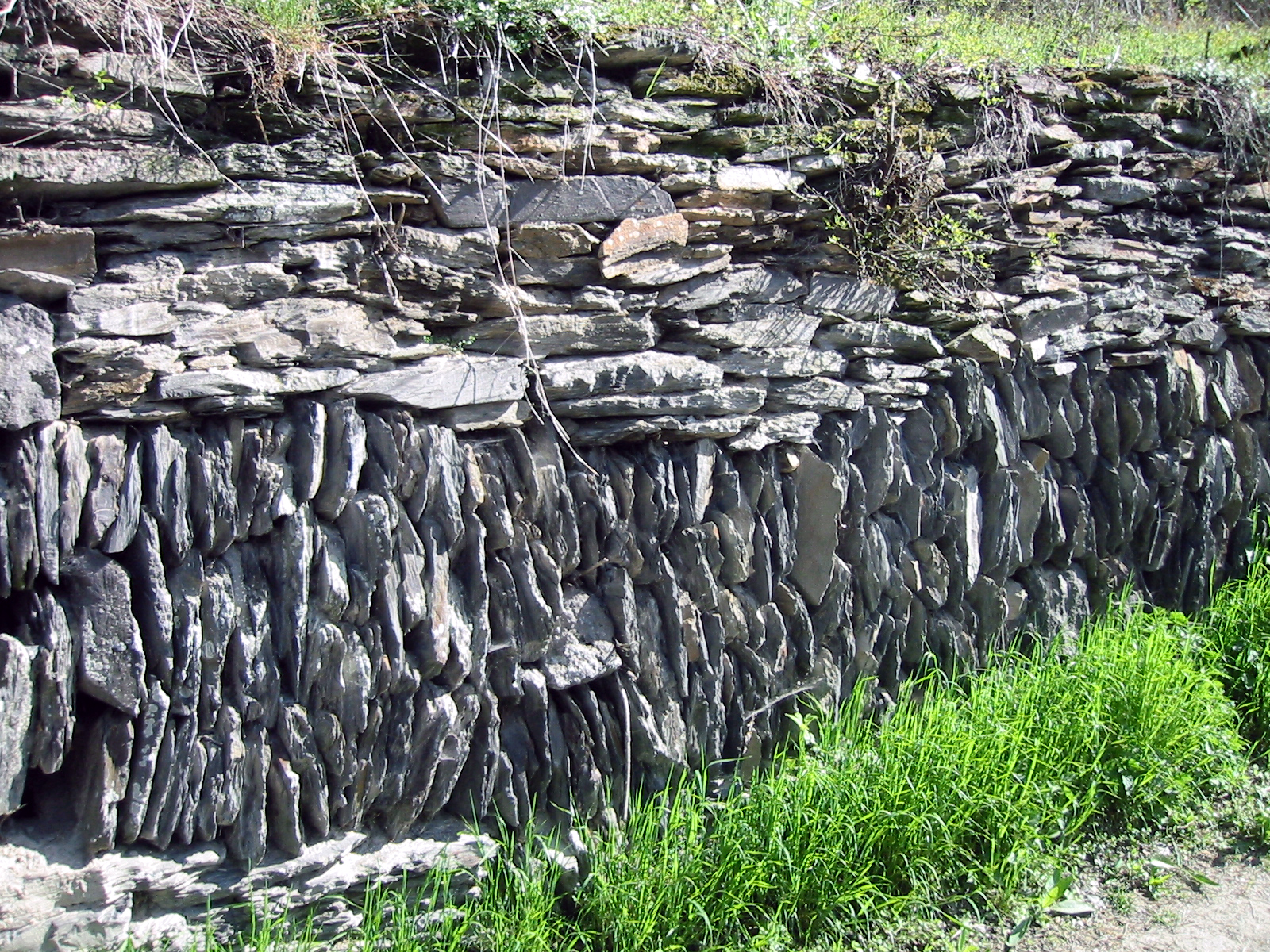
22. Vertical! Stone section in a terrace of the old vineyard In der Mark. Trimbs in the Nette valley

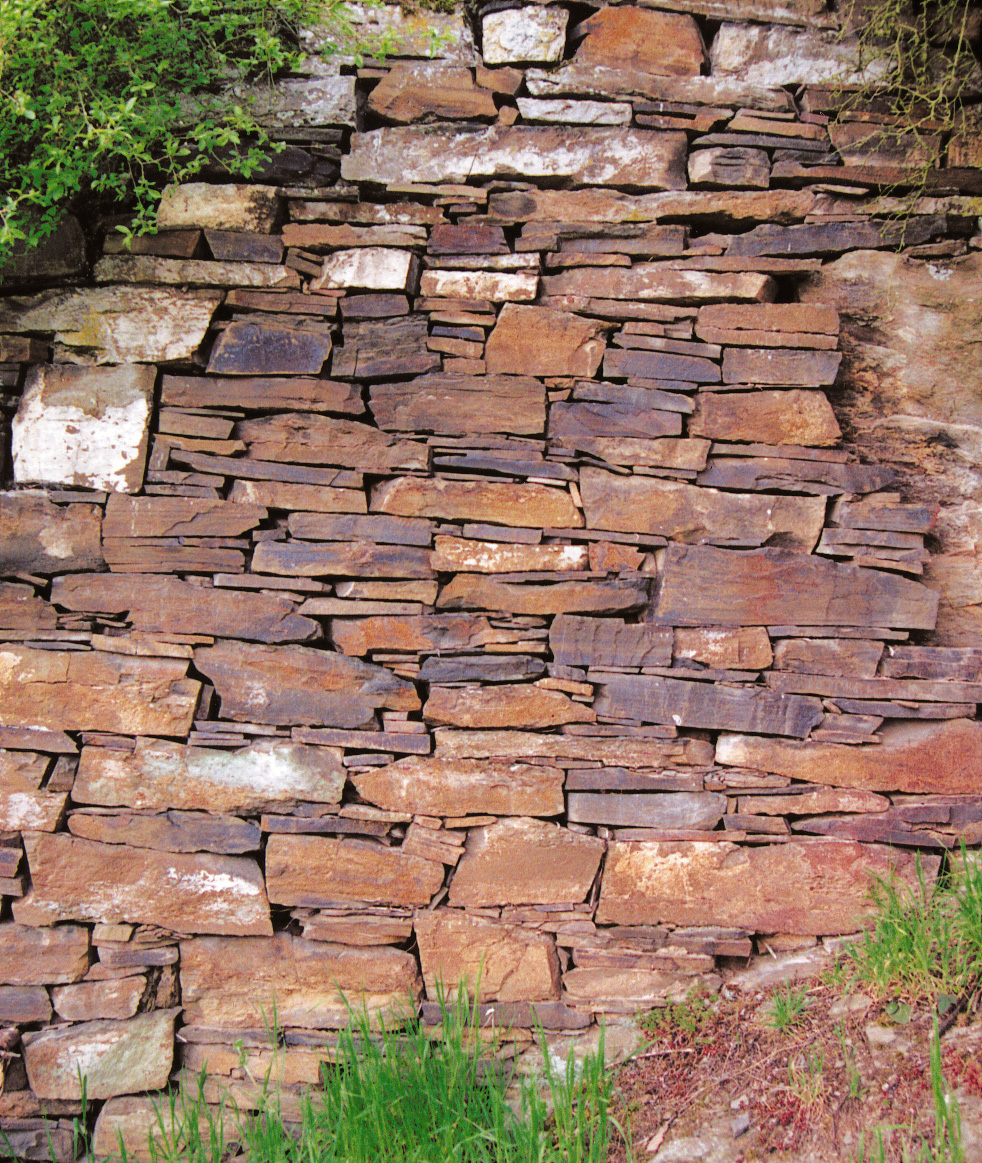
23. Ideal example of a dry stone wall. Built with stone broken on the spot. Hatzenporter Burg Bischofsteiner

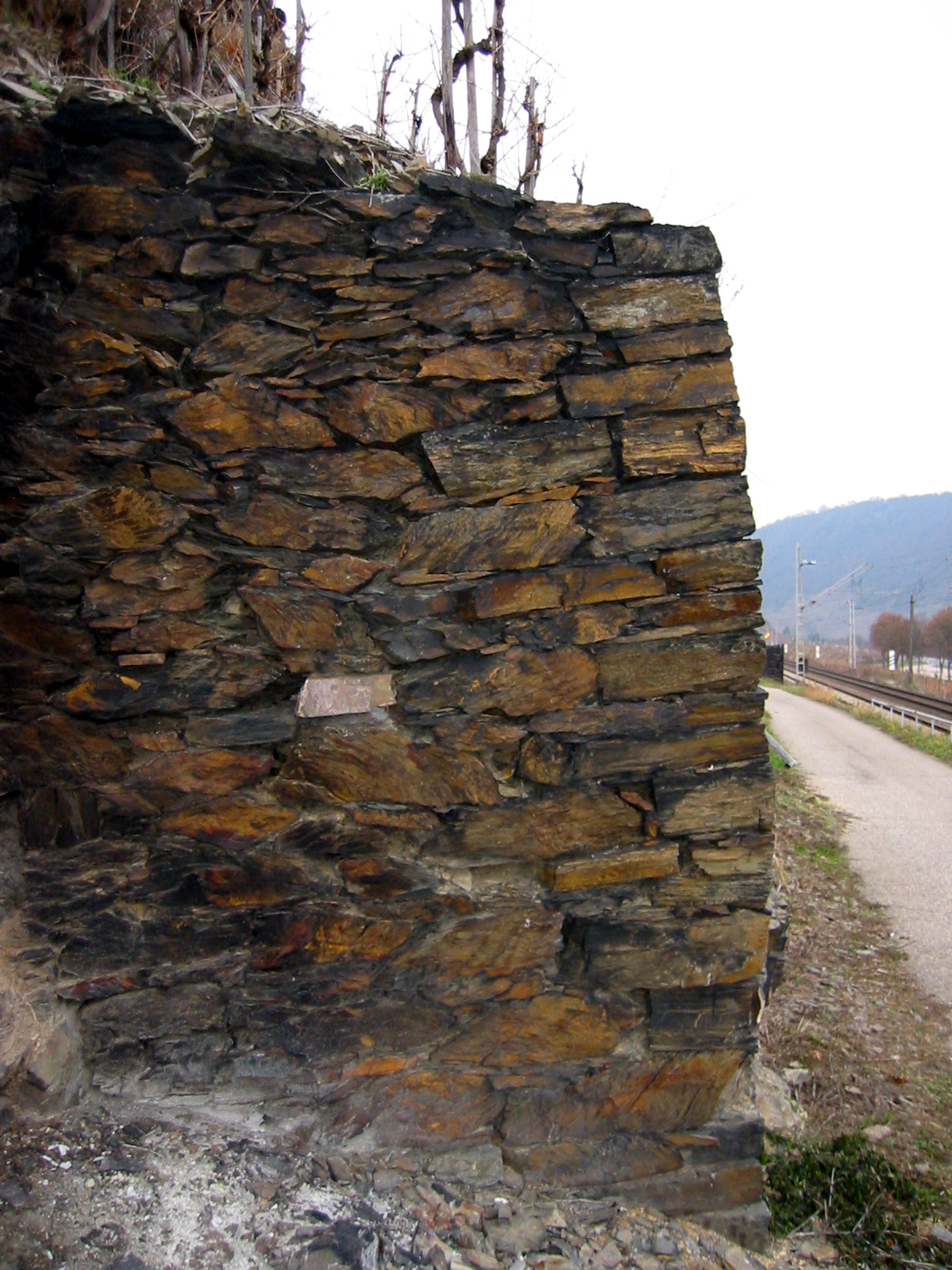
24. Solidly built wing wall. Lehmener Ausoniusstein

=== From old terraces and plantings to present-day recultivation ===
The Hatzenporter Kirchberg is an example of the changes in viticulture on the steep slopes with their old terraces (Figs. 30–33). Until the middle of the 20th century the hillsides of the village were largely planted and farmed by a large number of vintners. At the end of the century the number of vintners in Hatzenport and the plots tended by them had dropped sharply. An amalgamation of the plots, new tracks across the hillside and the abandonment of small terraces in higher locations enabled planting based on economical methods of cultivation.

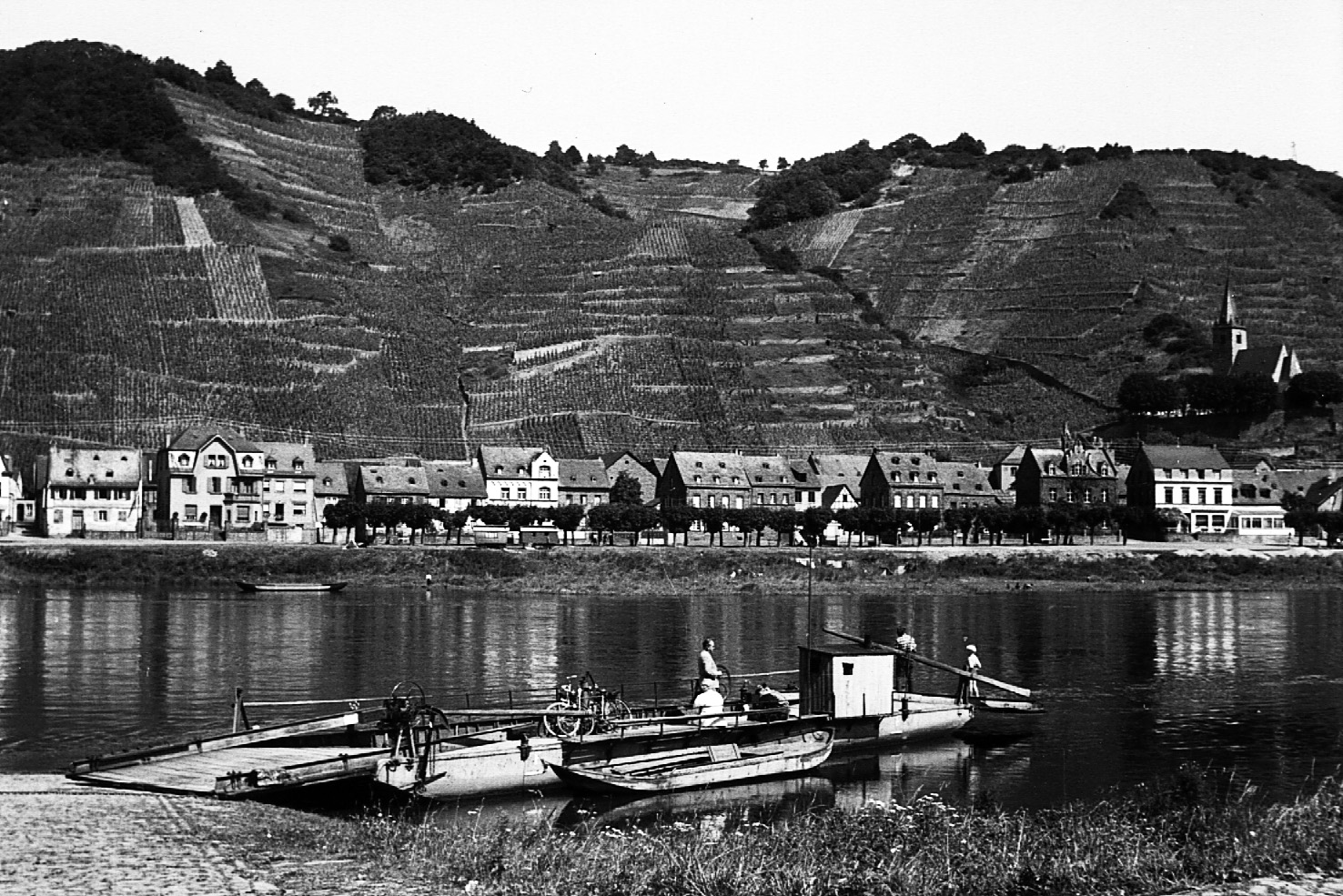
30. In the 1950s: planted terraces over the entire hillside. Hatzenporter Kirchberg

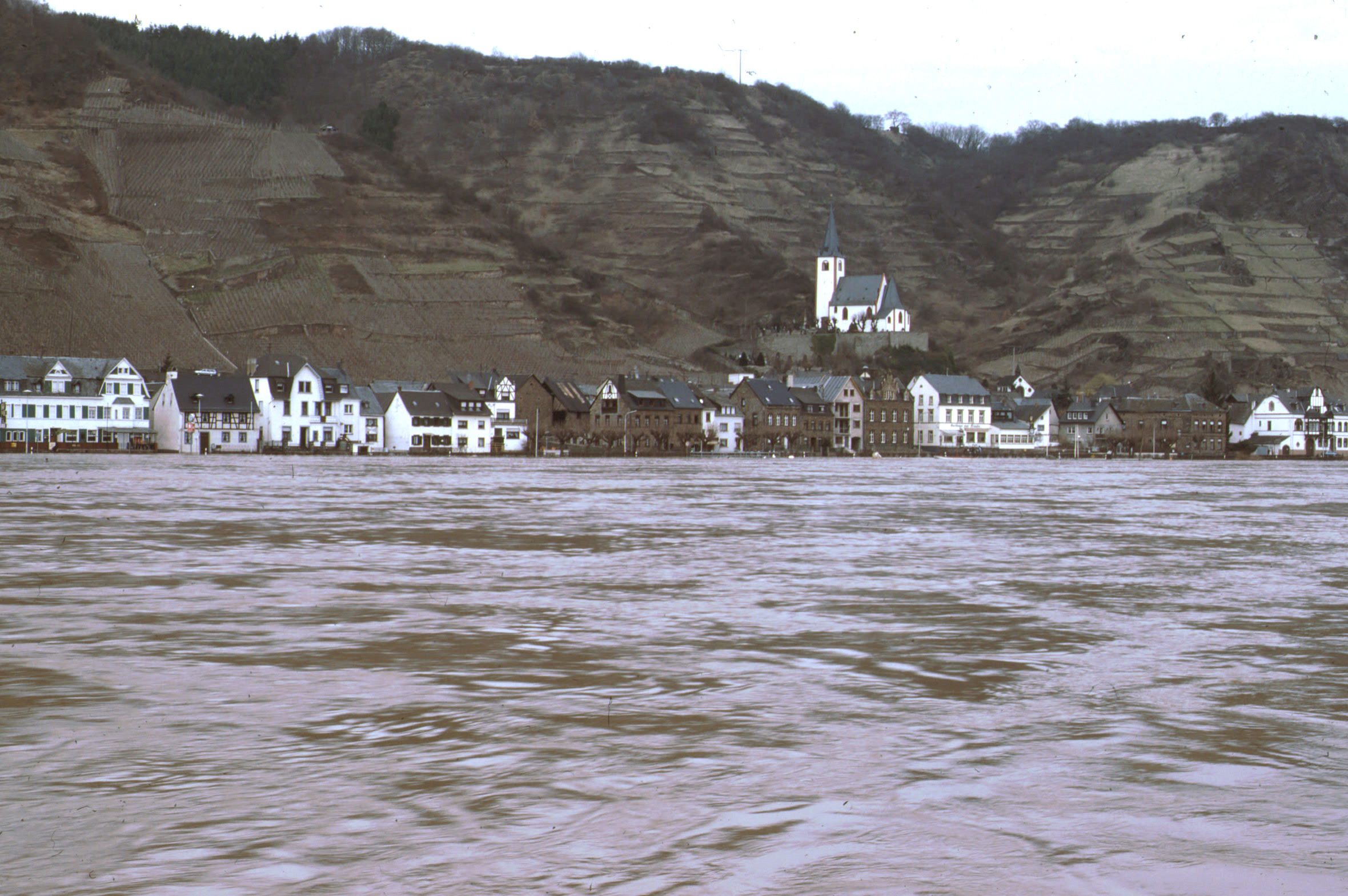
31. Around 1990: The Kirchberg with many abandoned terraces

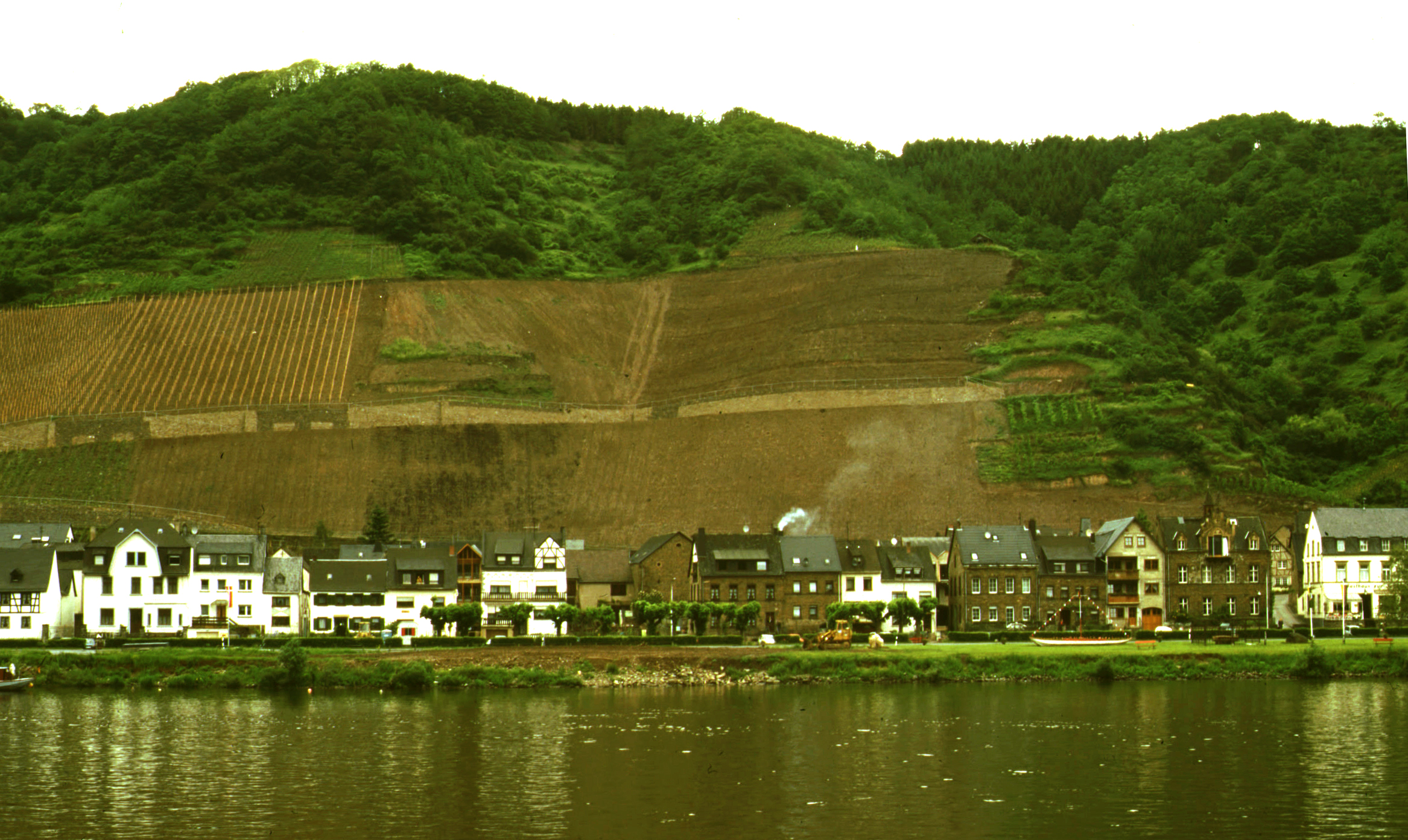
32. Around 1995: a new and double width track facilitates vehicles and the use of technical machines

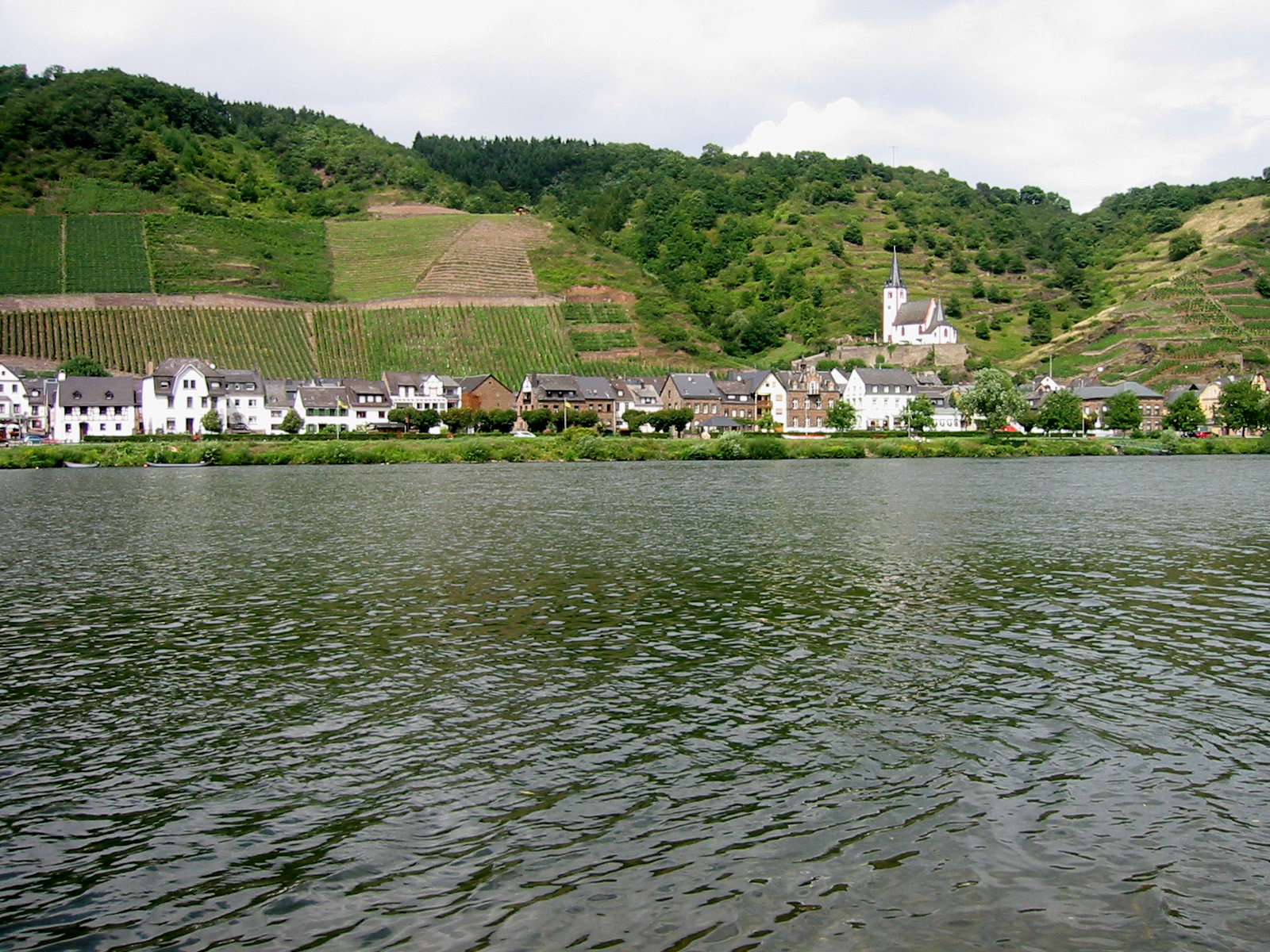
33. Since 2003 the Kirchberg has been classified as "first class"

== See also ==
- Middle Moselle
- Upper Moselle

== Literature ==
- Rheinisches Landesmuseum Trier: 2000 Jahre Weinkultur an Mosel-Saar-Ruwer. Ausstellungskatalog, Trier, 1987.
- Karl-Josef Gilles: Bacchus und Sucellus. Briedel, 1999, ISBN 3-89801-000-7.
- Franz Dötsch, Dieter Rogge: Weinbergsmauern in Steillagen – Geschichte, Formen und Bedeutung für die Untermosellandschaft. Kobern-Gondorf, 2002, ISBN 3-9806059-1-4.
- Joachim Krieger: Terrassenkultur an der Untermosel. Neuwied, 2003, ISBN 3-933104-08-4.
- H. Cüppers, K.-H. Faas, W. Stöhr: Mosel-Saar-Ruwer. Stuttgart 1981, ISBN 3-512-00546-2.
- Reinhard Löwenstein: Vom Öchsle zum Terroir. In: FAZ, 7 October 2003.
- Gesellschaft für die Geschichte des Weins e. V. Schriftenreihe zur Weingeschichte, Wiesbaden
