= Upper Moselle =

Upper part of the River Moselle in Germany

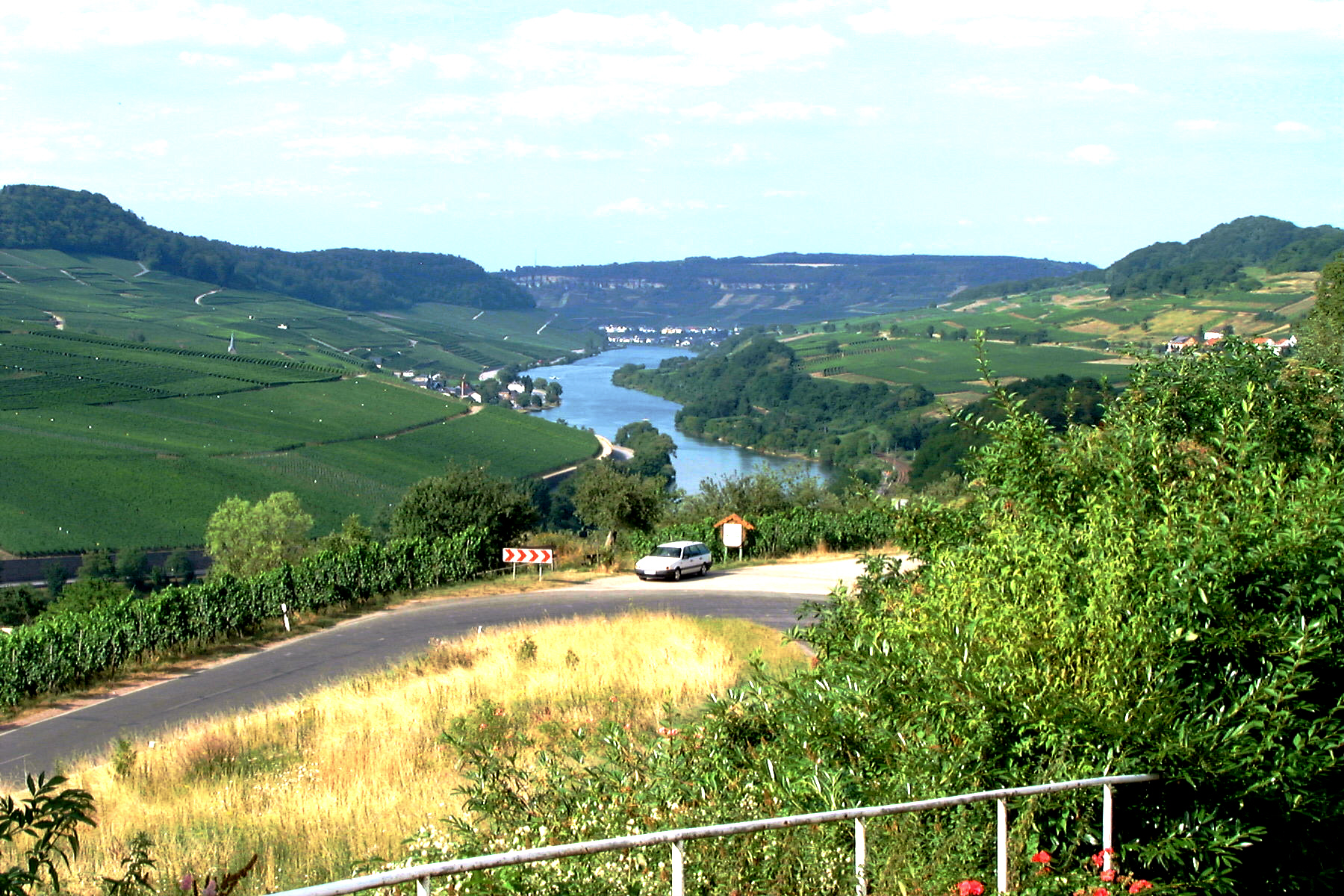
The Upper Moselle between Wincheringen and Nittel

The Upper Moselle (German: Obermosel) is the section of the River Moselle, 45 kilometres long, that runs from the Franco-German-Luxembourg tripoint near Perl to its confluence with the Saar near Konz shortly before Trier. From the tripoint to its confluence with the Sauer, the Upper Moselle forms the border between the German states of the Saarland and Rhineland-Palatinate on the one side and Luxembourg on the other. This stretch of the river known as the Upper Moselle is, however, not the same as the geographical upper reaches of the Moselle, which run from its source near Bussang in the Vosges mountains in Lorraine via Épinal and Nancy roughly as far as Metz.

Vineyards have been cultivated on the slopes of the Upper Moselle since Roman times. This wine-growing area is part of Germany's Moselle wine region (prior to 2007 it was known as the Moselle-Saar-Ruwer wine region) and bears the further title of the Southern Wine Moselle (Südliche Weinmosel). The Luxembourgois call the road running along the Upper Moselle on the Luxembourg bank of the river, the Luxembourg Wine Road.

Ironically, the only wine-growing region of the state of Saarland is not actually on the River Saar, but on the Upper Moselle in the municipality of Perl. But this is not where Saar wine is made which is also part of the Moselle wine region; that comes from the lower reaches of the Saar in the state of Rhineland-Palatinate. The wine made in the Saarland in the Moseltor ("Moselle Gate") area is also a Moselle wine.

"Wei-i gett mer al?", Rudolf Molter speaking in the Upper Moselle dialect at the open air museum of Roscheider Hof

The grape varieties grown on the Upper Moselle include Rivaner/Müller-Thurgau, Kerner, Pinot Blanc (Weißer Burgunder) and Pinot Noir (Blauer Spätburgunder) as well as Elbling, which is typical of the Upper Moselle and which the Romans are supposed to have introduced. In addition the wineries on the Upper Moselle offer sparkling wine (Winzersekt), wine and fruit spirits and liqueurs. They mainly market their products themselves and also offer them in wine or wine-tasting bars, wine taverns known as Straußwirtschaften and, during the summer months, at vineyard open days (Hoffesten).

== See also ==
Middle Moselle, Lower Moselle
