= Untermosel =

Municipality in Rhineland-Palatinate, Germany

Coordinates: 50°18′17″N 7°27′26″E

Untermosel is a former Verbandsgemeinde ("collective municipality") in the district Mayen-Koblenz, in Rhineland-Palatinate, Germany. It is situated along the lower course of the river Mosel, south-west of Koblenz. The seat of the municipality was in Kobern-Gondorf. On 1 July 2014 it merged into the new Verbandsgemeinde Rhein-Mosel.

The Verbandsgemeinde Untermosel consisted of the following Ortsgemeinden ("local municipalities"):

1. Alken
2. Brodenbach
3. Burgen
4. Dieblich
5. Hatzenport
6. Kobern-Gondorf
7. Lehmen
8. Löf
9. Macken
10. Niederfell
11. Nörtershausen
12. Oberfell
13. Winningen
14. Wolken
