= LOF =

LOF may refer to:

== Documents ==
- List of figures, a page index to all printed figures in a book

== Acronyms and codes ==
- Lack-of-fit test (disambiguation), a concept in statistics
- Libbey–Owens–Ford, an automotive and building glass manufacturer
- Lloyd's Open Form: a type of salvage agreement offered by Lloyd's of London
- Local Outlier Factor, an anomaly detection algorithm
- Lok Fu station, Hong Kong (MTR station code)
- London & Overseas Freighters, a defunct UK merchant shipping company
- London Fields railway station, England (National Rail station code)
- Trans States Airlines (ICAO designator)
- Leftöver Crack, a NYC crust punk band

== Other uses ==
- Lof, a Chilean ethnic group
- Löf, a municipality in Germany
