= São João do Oeste =

Coordinates: 27.0847°S 53.5939°W

- Municipality
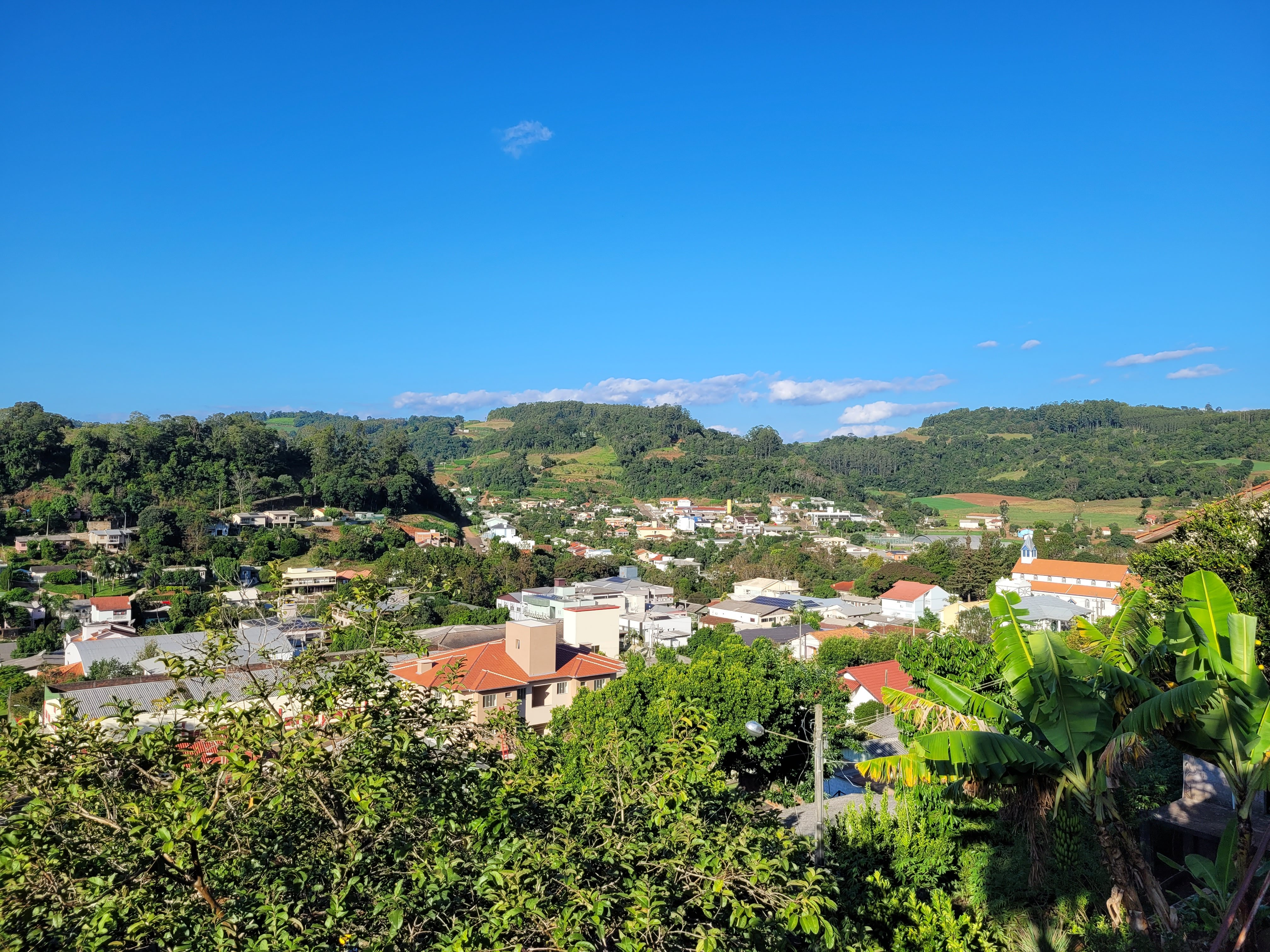
- Partial view

- Flag Coat of arms

- Country: Brazil
- Region: South
- State: Santa Catarina
- Mesoregion: Oeste Catarinense

Population (2020)
  - Total: 6,402
- Time zone: UTC -3

São João do Oeste is a municipality in the state of Santa Catarina in the South region of Brazil.

== German as a regional language ==
The vast majority of the population inhabiting this western region of the state of Santa Catarina is bilingual, speaking both Riograndenser Hunsrückisch German dialect as well as Portuguese, the national language. The vast majority of Riograndenser Hunsrückisch speakers, an estimated three to four million, reside and have historically lived in the neighboring state of Rio Grande do Sul. There are other varieties of the Hunsrückisch dialect that are spoken elsewhere in the state of Santa Catarina by much smaller populations: see Antônio Carlos (Santa Catarina), a municipality where Hunsrückisch is a co-official language.

== See also ==
- List of municipalities in Santa Catarina
