= Rhen =

Rhen can refer to:

- Rhens, a municipality in the district Mayen-Koblenz in Rhineland-Palatinate, Germany
  - Rhens (Verbandsgemeinde), a collective municipality within Rhens
  - Upper Rhenish Circle, an Imperial Circle of the Holy Roman Empire
  - Upper Rhenish Master, an artist active ca. 1410-20, possibly in Strasbourg
  - Lower Rhenish–Westphalian Circle, an Imperial Circle of the Holy Roman Empire
  - Lower Rhenish Music Festival, annual classical music festival at Pentecost between 1818 and 1958
- Rhen Var, a planet in the Star Wars Universe
  - Battle of Rhen Var, a battle in the Clone Wars (Star Wars)
- Rhen's Quest, the first in the commercial Aveyond series of games
- Crimson Rhen, the main protagonist of the Shadowbinders comic book series

== See also ==
- Rhene (disambiguation)
