= Brodenbach =

- Municipality
- Coat of arms
- Interactive map of Brodenbach
- Location within Germany Location within Rhineland-Palatinate
- Coordinates: 50°13′33″N 7°26′47″E
- Country: Germany
- State: Rhineland-Palatinate
- District: Mayen-Koblenz
- Municipal assoc.: Rhein-Mosel
- Subdivisions: 2 Ortsteile

Government
  - Mayor (2024–29): Andreas Griebel (CDU)

Area
  - Total: 9.67 km^{2} (3.73 sq mi)
- Elevation: 95 m (312 ft)

Population (2025-12-31)
  - Total: 669
  - Density: 69.2/km^{2} (179/sq mi)
- Time zone: UTC+01:00 (CET)
  - Summer (DST): UTC+02:00 (CEST)
- Postal codes: 56332
- Dialling codes: 02605
- Vehicle registration: MYK, MY
- Website: brodenbach.de

Brodenbach (German pronunciation: [ˈbʁoːdn̩bax]) is an Ortsgemeinde on the Moselle in the Mayen-Koblenz district of Rhineland-Palatinate, western Germany. It belongs to the Verbandsgemeinde Rhein-Mosel, whose seat is in Kobern-Gondorf, and had 688 inhabitants at the end of 2024.

Brodenbach lies on the right bank of the river in the stretch known as the Terrassenmosel (terraced Moselle). It is a state-recognized health resort (staatlich anerkannter Erholungsort) and has a long tradition of viticulture.

== Geography ==
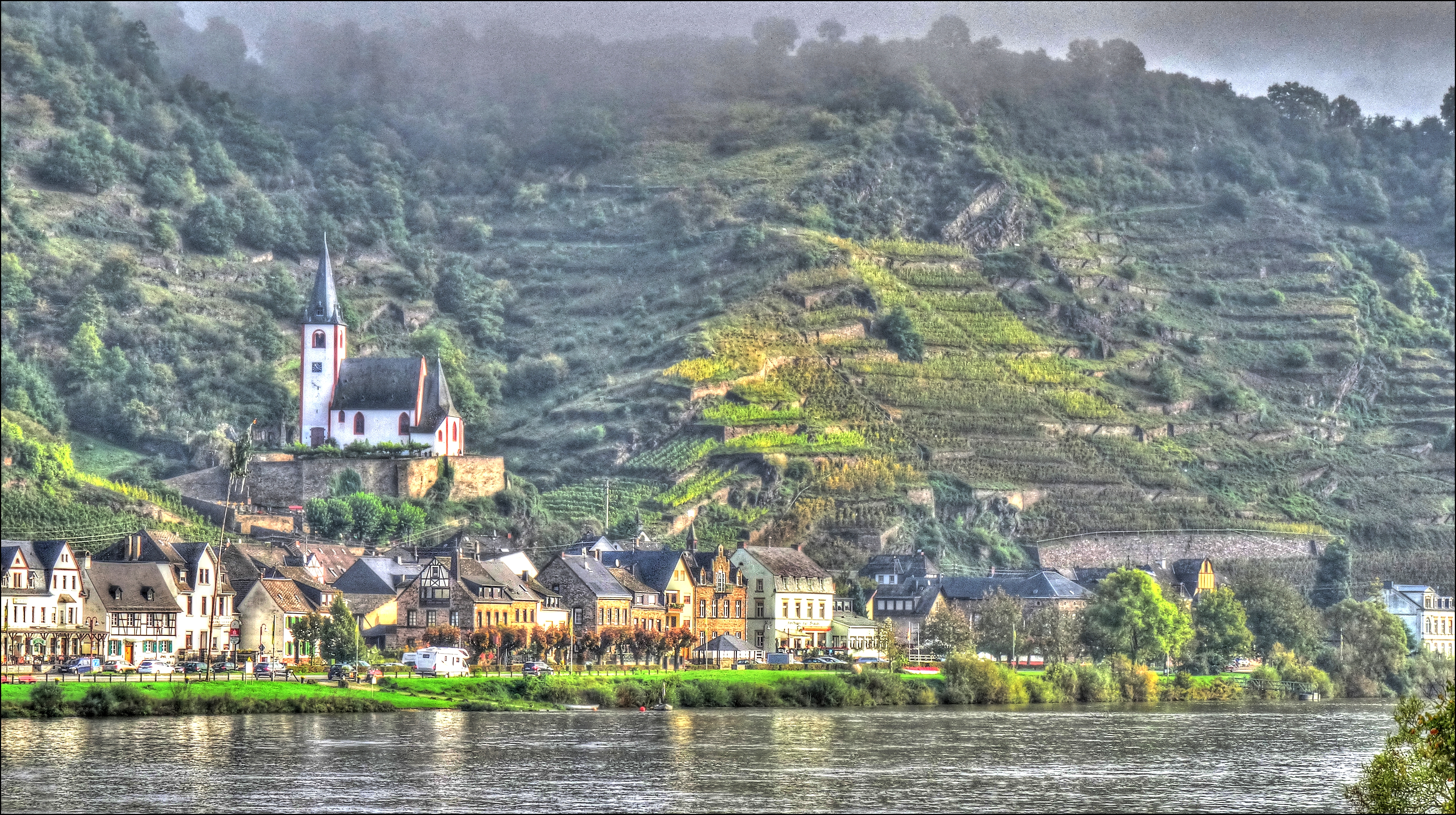
Brodenbach seen from the opposite bank of the Moselle

The village core lies along the Moselle between the mouths of the Brodenbach and Ehrbach streams, with a residential area to the south that has grown steadily since the 1970s. The Ortsteil of Ehrenburgertal lies in the Ehrbach valley below Ehrenburg Castle, and several farms and mills on the heights of the Vorderhunsrück also belong to the municipality.

== History ==
Ehrenburg castle was built above the Ehrbach valley around 1161, and its lords, the knights of Ehrenberg, are first recorded in 1189.

The place name itself first appears in 1189, as Brodinheim, in a charter of the Archbishop of Cologne concerning a holding of the Cologne abbey of St. Pantaleon. The settlement is thought to have been laid waste during the siege of nearby Thurant Castle in 1247–48 and abandoned; wall remains found during excavation work in the village may belong to it.

Until the French Revolution the farms and settlements that make up present-day Brodenbach were held mostly as fiefs of the Counts of Sponheim and the Electors Palatine, while in church matters the inhabitants belonged to the parish of Löf across the river. They were combined into a municipality under the Prussian administrative reform of 1816/17, and Brodenbach became the seat of a Bürgermeisterei (mayoralty) covering several places on the lower Moselle and in the Vorderhunsrück. The municipality joined the Verbandsgemeinde of Untermosel in 1970 and that of Rhein-Mosel in 2014.

The population was 326 in 1815, 476 in 1871, 659 in 1950, 672 in 2022 and 688 in 2024.

== Politics ==
The municipal council has twelve members, elected on 9 June 2024, together with the honorary mayor as chairman. The local voters' association Freie Wähler holds seven seats and the CDU five.

Andreas Griebel (CDU) became mayor in May 2023, chosen by the council after no candidate had stood at the scheduled direct election, and was confirmed unopposed with 82.4 percent of the vote in June 2024.

The municipality was granted its arms in 1980. The silver wings are those of the barons of Cloth, knights of the Imperial Knighthood of Ehrenberg until 1798; the church represents the parish church of the Holy Cross, and the wavy white bend stands for the Moselle.

== Main sights ==
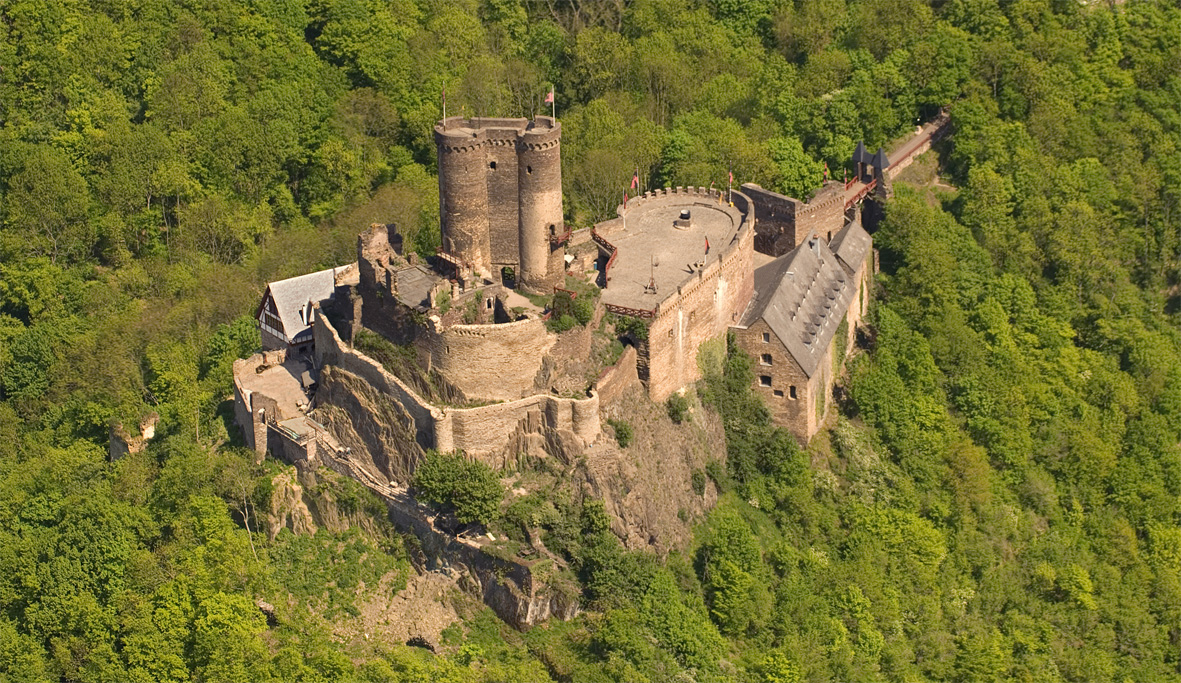
Ehrenburg castle from the air

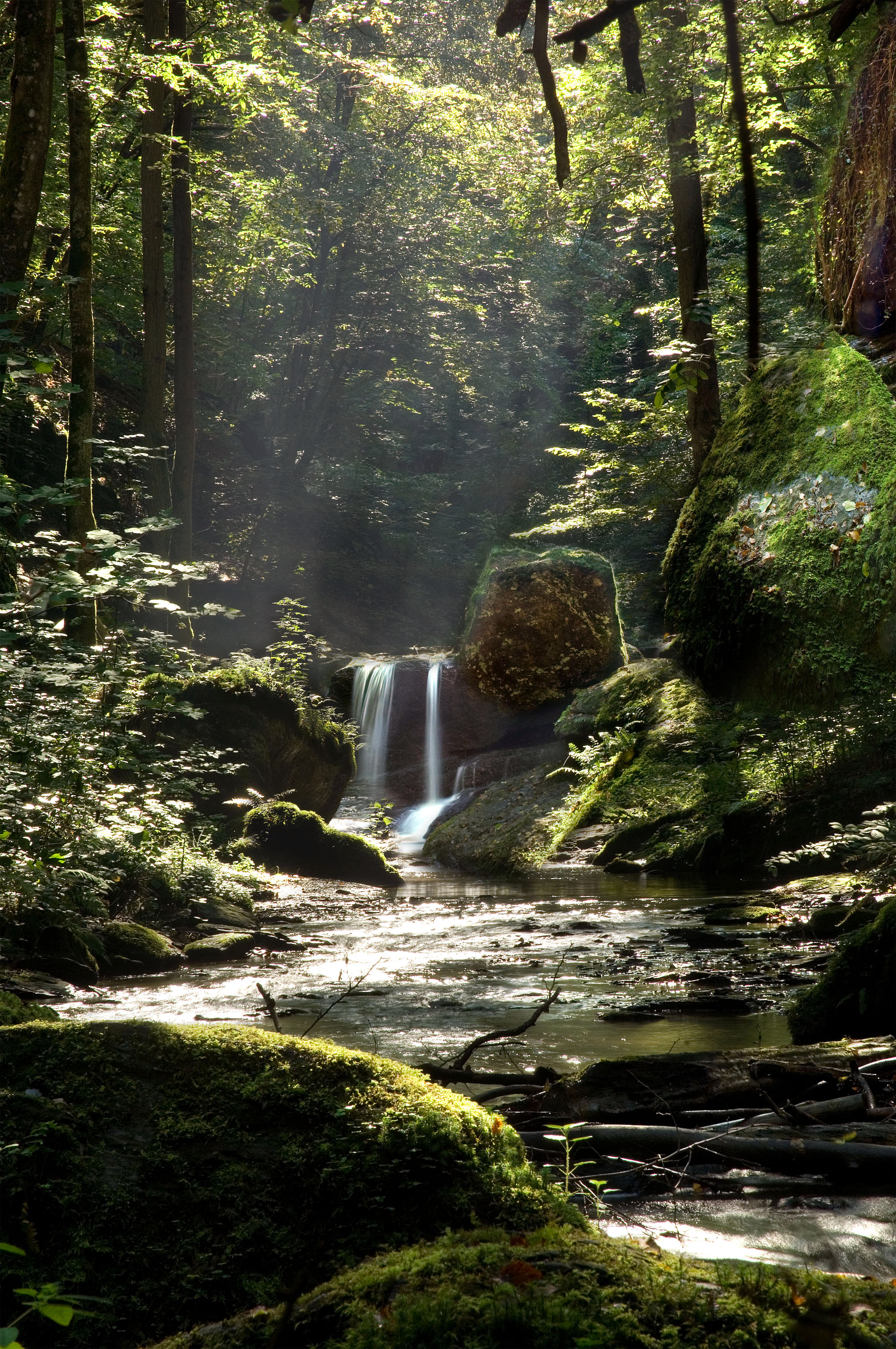
Waterfall in the Ehrbachklamm

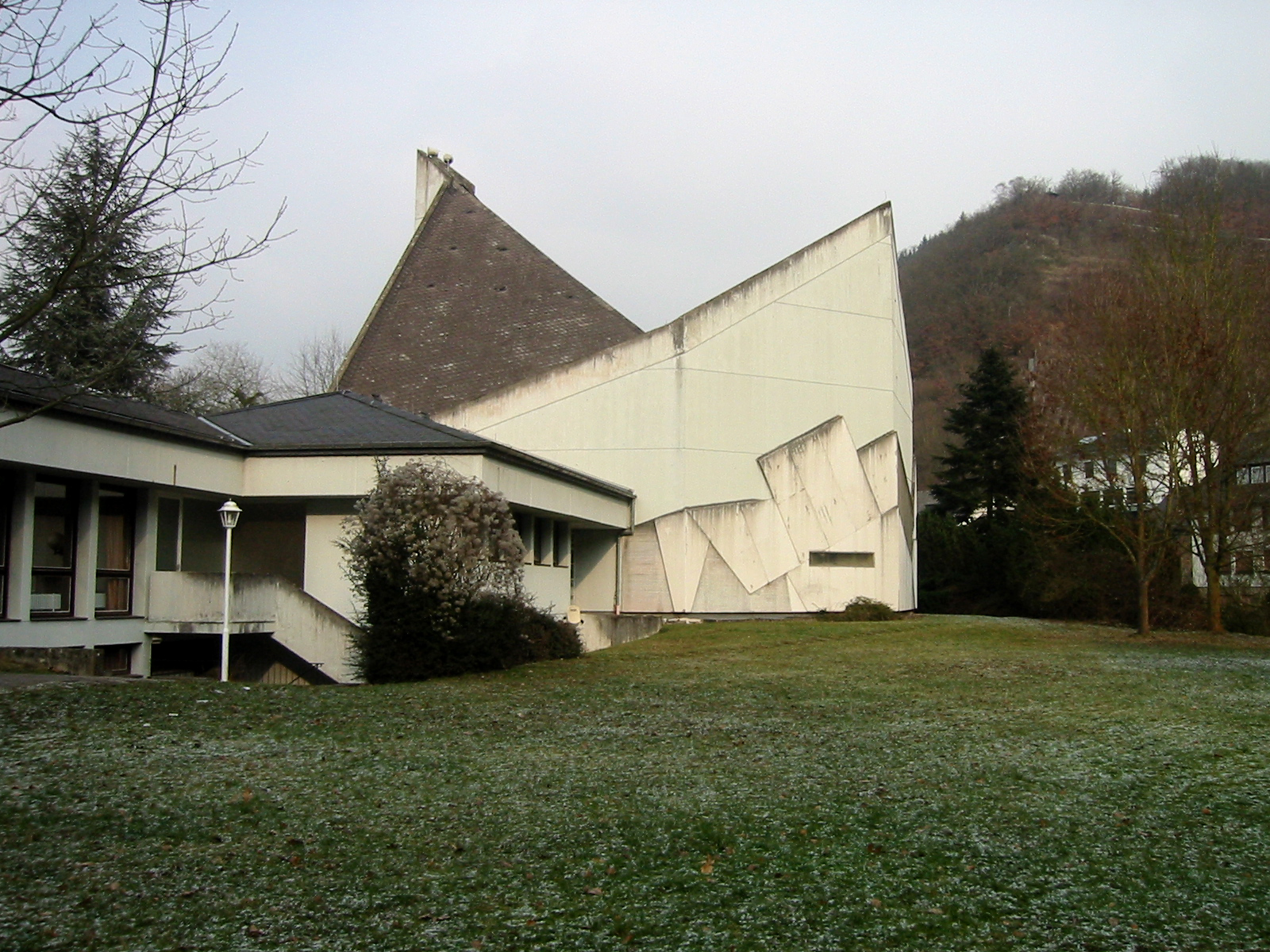
The church of the Holy Cross, built 1971–1973

- Ehrenburg, a ruined castle on a rocky spur above the Ehrbach valley, with remains of a Hohenstaufen core castle of the 12th century, a twin-towered structure of the mid-14th century, and a late 15th-century ramp tower for artillery that is a notable example of late medieval fortification.
- The Ehrbachklamm, a rocky gorge accessible only on foot, with waterfalls along the stream. Nearby are Schöneck Castle and the ruined Rauschenburg, built in 1332 by Archbishop Baldwin of Luxembourg as a counter-castle during the Eltz Feud, directed against the lords of Ehrenburg and their allies.
- The Catholic church of the Holy Cross (Vom Heiligen Kreuz), built in 1971–1973 to a design by the Düsseldorf architect Werner Köster, with a hexagonal plan in exposed concrete modeled on Kenzō Tange's St. Mary's Cathedral. It contains a rococo altar and late Gothic and baroque figures from the former parish church.
- A sandstone votive cross of 1446 set into a house façade in the village center, commemorating the knight Cuno von Pyrmont und von Ehrenberg and bearing the arms of several Moselle and Lower Rhine noble families.

== Viticulture ==
Vines have been cultivated on this stretch of the Moselle since Roman times, and the lords of Ehrenberg, recorded from 1189, drew part of their income from vineyards. Charters of the Counts of Sponheim describe vineyard sites at Brodenbach from about 1400 as property of the imperial lordship of Ehrenberg, and a lease of 1642 put the Ehrenberg holdings, including sites near Boppard on the Rhine, at some 80,000 vines.

In 1819 the Prussian administration informed 27 tenant families, in a village of about 40 households, that their sites were classified only in the third class. Many vines froze in the severe winters of the mid-1950s and cultivation of the steep terraces was widely abandoned. Three winegrowing families remain, working mainly with Riesling. Because much of their land lies in the neighboring municipality of Alken, German wine labeling rules introduced in 1971 left Neuwingert as the only site name still marketed as a Brodenbach growth. The village holds a wine and local heritage festival on the second weekend in September.

== Transport and tourism ==
The B 49 federal road runs through the village along the river, and buses link Brodenbach with Koblenz and Emmelshausen. The nearest railway station is Löf on the Moselle Valley Railway, on the opposite bank. A harbor serves commercial shipping and leisure craft.

The two densely wooded side valleys give the village its status as a health resort, and tourism was already an important economic factor by the end of the 19th century. Its position as a starting point for walks led the German Youth Hostel Association to open here, in 1928, the first youth hostel on the left bank of the Rhine.
