= Rhens (Verbandsgemeinde) =

Municipality in Rhineland-Palatinate, Germany

Coordinates: 50.280°N 7.618°E

Rhens is a former Verbandsgemeinde ("collective municipality") in the district Mayen-Koblenz, in Rhineland-Palatinate, Germany. The seat of the municipality was in Rhens. On 1 July 2014 it merged into the new Verbandsgemeinde Rhein-Mosel.

The Verbandsgemeinde Rhens consisted of the following Ortsgemeinden ("local municipalities"):

1. Brey
2. Rhens
3. Spay
4. Waldesch
