= Rhene (disambiguation) =

Rhene is a spider genus of the family Salticidae (jumping spiders).

Rhene may also refer to:

- Rhene (island), Greek island in the Aegean Sea
- Rhene (mythology), a nymph of Mount Cyllene in Greek mythology
- Rhene (Diemel), a river of Hesse, Germany, tributary of the Diemel

== See also ==
- Rhen (disambiguation)
