= Bernardo Schappo =

Brazilian footballer (born 1999)

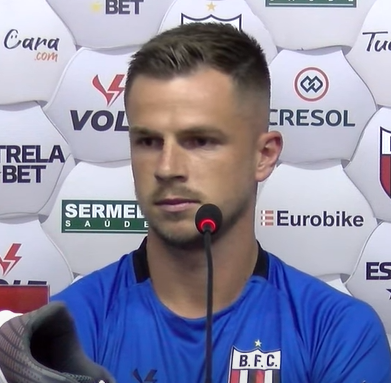
- Bernardo in 2024

Personal information
- Full name: Bernardo Schappo
- Date of birth: 22 March 1999 (age 27)
- Place of birth: Antônio Carlos, Brazil
- Height: 1.91 m (6 ft 3 in)
- Position: Centre back

Team information
- Current team: Estrela da Amadora
- Number: 4

Youth career
- 2017–2019: Ituano

Senior career*
Years	Team	Apps	(Gls)
2018–2023	Ituano	63	(4)
2023–2025	Fortaleza	0	(0)
2024	→ Botafogo-SP (loan)	43	(2)
2025	→ Vila Nova (loan)	25	(4)
2025–	Estrela da Amadora	26	(0)
- * Club domestic league appearances and goals as of 25 May 2026

Bernardo Schappo (born 22 March 1999), sometimes known as just Bernardo, is a Brazilian professional footballer who plays as a centre-back for Primeira Liga club Estrela da Amadora.

== Club career ==
=== Ituano ===
Born in Antônio Carlos, Santa Catarina, Bernardo joined Ituano's youth setup in 2017, aged 18. He made his first team debut on 8 August 2018, coming on as a first-half substitute in a 3–1 Copa Paulista away loss against Nacional-SP.

On 15 December 2019, Bernardo was promoted to the first team ahead of the 2020 season. After being only a backup option in his first years, he became a first-choice during the 2021 Série C, as his side achieved promotion to the Série B.

On 9 March 2022, Bernardo renewed his contract with Galo until December 2024.

=== Fortaleza ===
On 31 March 2023, Série A side Fortaleza announced the signing of Bernardo on a four-year contract.

=== Estrela da Amadora ===
On 9 July 2025, Bernardo moved to Portugal, joining Primeira Liga club Estrela da Amadora on a three-year contract.

== Career statistics ==
As of 17 March 2023

Club	Season	League			State league		Cup		Continental		Other		Total	
Club	Season	Division	Apps	Goals	Apps	Goals	Apps	Goals	Apps	Goals	Apps	Goals	Apps	Goals
Ituano	2018	Paulista	—		0	0	—		—		1 (Note: Appearance(s) in Copa Paulista)	0	1	0
Ituano	2019	Série D	0	0	0	0	—		—		—		0	0
Ituano	2020	Série C	0	0	0	0	—		—		—		0	0
Ituano	2021	Série C	17	1	0	0	—		—		—		17	1
Ituano	2022	Série B	29	3	5	0	—		—		—		34	3
Ituano	2023	Série B	0	0	12	0	1	0	—		—		13	0
Ituano	Total		46	4	17	0	1	0	—		1	0	65	4
Fortaleza	2023	Série A	0	0	—		—		0	0	—		0	0
Botafogo-SP (loan)	2024	Série B	0	0	0	0	0	0	—		—		0	0
Career total			46	4	17	0	1	0	0	0	1	0	65	4

== Honours ==
Ituano

- Campeonato Brasileiro Série C: 2021
