= Hunsrik =

Germanic language spoken in South America

- Pronunciation: [ˈhunsɾɪk]
- Native to: Brazil (Rio Grande do Sul, Santa Catarina, and Paraná)
- Region: South America
- Ethnicity: German Brazilians
- Native speakers: est. 3,000,000
- Language family: Indo-European: Germanic; West Germanic; Weser-Rhine Germanic; Central German; West Central German; Moselle Franconian; Hunsrik
- Writing system: Latin

Official status
- Official language in: Brazil: Antônio Carlos; Santa Maria do Herval; São João do Oeste

Language codes
- ISO 639-3: hrx
- Glottolog: riog1239

Dona Noêmia speaking in Brazilian Hunsrik
- https://www.youtube.com/watch?v=nKB5dszpqSM

Hunsrik (natively Hunsrik [ˈhunsɾɪk], Hunsrückisch or Hunsrickisch and Portuguese hunsriqueano or hunsriqueano riograndense), also called Riograndese Hunsrik, Riograndenser Hunsrückisch or Katharinensisch, is a Moselle Franconian language spoken by an estimated 3 million people in parts of Brazil. It is derived primarily from the Hunsrückisch dialect of West Central German.

Hunsrik is spoken in the Brazilian states of Rio Grande do Sul, Santa Catarina, and Paraná, as well as some regions of neighboring Paraguay and Argentina. It is a co-official language in the Brazilian municipalities of Antônio Carlos, Santa Maria do Herval, and São João do Oeste. It has been an integral part of the historical and cultural heritage of the Brazilian state of Rio Grande do Sul since 2012, and considered an intangible cultural heritage of Santa Catarina state since 2016.

Hunsrik developed from the Hunsrückisch dialect spoken by immigrants from the Hunsrück region of Germany (Rhineland-Palatinate, Saarland) who settled in Brazil's southern region such as Rio Grande do Sul, beginning under the Empire of Brazil in 1824. This immigration later fell under the control of individual states, and then of private European investment enterprises. While primarily based on the Hunsrückisch branch of the German language, it has also been greatly influenced by other German dialects such as East Pomeranian and Plautdietsch and by Portuguese, the national language of Brazil. It has been influenced to a lesser extent by indigenous languages such as Kaingang and Guarani and by immigrant languages such as Italian and Talian.

Portuguese expressions and words are commonly imported into Hunsrik, particularly in reference to fauna and flora (which are different from those of Germany) and to technological innovations that did not exist when the original immigrants came to Brazil, leading to words like Aviong for airplane (Portuguese avião) instead of Flugzeug, Kamiong (Pt. caminhão, truck) instead of Lastwagen, Tëlevisong (Pt. televisão) instead of Fernseher, etc. Daily expressions are often calques (literal translations) of Portuguese.

Also common are the use of German suffixes attached to Portuguese words, such as Canecache, "little mug", from Portuguese caneca, "mug", and German diminutive suffix -chen (-che in Hunsrik); hybrid forms such as Schuhloja, "shoe shop", from German Schuh and Portuguese loja, and Germanized forms of Portuguese verbs: lembreere, "to remember"; namoreere "to flirt"; respondeere, "to answer" (Portuguese lembrar, namorar, and responder). However, regardless of these borrowings, its grammar and vocabulary are still largely Germanic.

Although Hunsrik is the most common Germanic language in south Brazil, the use of this language—particularly in the last three to four generations—continues to decrease. Glottolog classifies the language as "shifting" on its Agglomerated Endangerment Status.

== History ==
=== In Germany ===
The Hunsrückisch dialect, from which Hunsrik derived, has its origins in the Moselle Franconian dialects spoken in the Hunsrück region, on the banks of the Rhine and Moselle rivers, in western Germany. Germany, as a national state, only unified in 1871, so the standard High German existing today was, until the 19th century, a literary language, a descendent of the one used by Martin Luther in his famous translation of the Bible. The German people, in their daily lives, did not use standard German to communicate, but several regional dialects.

Until around 1800, Standard German was primarily a written language in Germany. Standard German was often learned as a foreign language and had an uncertain pronunciation. With the country's unification process and the mass literacy of the population, standard German has become the language used by speakers of different dialects to understand each other, although regional dialects have remained the language used at home.

=== In Brazil ===
With German immigration to Brazil, over the past two centuries, German dialects have also come to establish themselves as a regional language. However, something curious happened: while in Germany standard German served for speakers of different dialects to communicate, in Brazil, due to the still incipient consolidation of standard German when immigration started, this role was played by the Hunsrückisch dialect. There are two hypotheses for this phenomenon. The first because most immigrants would have come from Hunsrück, so their dialect predominated. The second because Hunsrückisch has intermediate features between the different German dialects, so it served as a koiné between speakers of various dialects. What is known is that German immigrants in Brazil came from different parts of Germany, so Hunsrik-speaking Brazilians do not necessarily descend from people from Hunsrück. In these German communities, the Hunsrückisch dialect remained the main language of communication for several decades. German colonies in the South were usually formed in regions of forest depopulated or inhabited by Indians, who were expelled for the arrival of immigrants. Due to this isolation, the Germans managed to create a "linguistic island", in which German was the main language, and not Portuguese. At the beginning of the 20th century, there were hundreds of thousands of second- and third-generation German-Brazilians who could barely speak Portuguese. This differentiation favored the feeling of a minority group, which allied itself with the formation of solid ethnic institutions, such as schools, churches, social associations and a German-language press. All of these elements combined promoted a general feeling of "cultural group".

In 1930, there were 2,500 ethnic schools in Brazil. Of these, 1,579 were from German immigrants. In these schools, children learned the standard German that is spread in Germany. This linguistic and cultural isolation was combated aggressively by the nationalist government of then Brazil's president Getúlio Vargas, through the nationalization campaign. All German schools in the country were closed, annihilating the German-Brazilian middle school. The standard German learned at school was thus eliminated, greatly weakening the use of German in urban centers, which became limited to the countryside. People were harassed and beaten if they spoke German on the street. The police inspected people's private lives, breaking into houses to burn books written in German, or languages other than Portuguese. Many people were arrested for the simple fact that they spoke German. In 1942, 1.5% of the inhabitants of Blumenau were imprisoned for speaking German. The closure of schools has caused people to become increasingly attached to the German dialect used in everyday life, far from standard German.

== Language name ==
The language has two main names—Hunsrik and Hunsrückisch—because it initially lacked an official grammar and is not governed by a centralized entity. One of the first efforts to standardize the language was done by Adriano Steffler, who developed a "Hunsrik Grammar", "Hunsrik Dictionary", and an alphabet. His 45-character alphabet is a combination of the Latin alphabet (all except Q) and other Latin characters, as well as Cyrillic, Armenian, Coptic, and Greek. The grammar developed by Steffler is not currently applied in any teaching method or government initiative.

Currently, the language has two codification proposals. The first, from the SIL International, is led by professor and doctor Ursula Wiesemann and has an approach more focused on using the writing system used naturally by its native speakers in everyday actions, such as interpersonal interaction and the use of social networks. With a strong influence of the Latin alphabet used in Portuguese, it has the native name of Hunsrik, with the aim of distinguishing it as a unique Germanic language and not just as a dialect of the German language. This codification is applied in the teaching of municipal schools in Santa Maria do Herval, Estância Velha, and Nova Hartz, as well as in other municipalities in Rio Grande do Sul. The name Hunsrik can also be used officially to refer to the language in English and Portuguese, being officially called "Hunsrik language" by most federative entities that recognize it in Brazil. The spelling translated into Portuguese as "Brazilian Hunsrückisch" is also accepted by the project, however the preference is for the use of the former to generate a clearer differentiation of the language.

The second coding project, from the Federal University of Rio Grande do Sul, is led by doctor and professor Cléo Vilson Altenhofen and has a more unionist approach to the German language, characterized by the preservation of the writing of the German Hunsrückisch dialect with few variations. This project recommends the spelling Hunsrückisch to refer to the dialect in its native form, with Hunsrickisch being an alternative as a way to emphasize the pronunciation of the word. At the same time, the project states that it refers to the same language denoted by Hunsrik in other projects and also accepts it as a spelling. The term Hunsrückisch is also used officially in statements by some federal entities. To differentiate the dialect used in Brazil from that used in Germany, Altenhofen called the Brazilian dialect Riograndenser Hunsrückisch (with reference to the state of Rio Grande do Sul). This nomenclature, however, is criticized by other scholars, since there are also considerable numbers of native speakers in other Brazilian states, as well as in other countries.

Currently, UNESCO officially uses the Hunsrik spelling to refer to the language in its native form, made official with that name after studies by Ethnologue, an official advisory institution of the international body and whose publications are led by SIL International. The Hunsrik spelling is also used by Glottolog in its bibliographic database of the least known languages in the world, catalog of the Max Planck Institute for Evolutionary Anthropology. Other international bodies that use this native spelling in the recognition of Hunsrik as a language are the Open Language Archives Community (OLAC) from the University of Pennsylvania in Philadelphia and the International Organization for Standardization; the latter assigns the hrx code as ISO 639-3 for the Hunsrik language. In some municipalities in the metropolitan region of Porto Alegre, the language is also called Deitsch (Altenhofen) or Taytx (Wiesemann), in clear reference to its roots in standard German.

== Notable speakers ==
Recent Roman Catholic papal candidate Odilo Scherer of Cerro Largo (located in the northwest of Rio Grande do Sul) grew up with Hunsrik as many from his native region did, using it side-by-side with Portuguese, the national language.

Roman Catholic Cardinal Cláudio Hummes of Montenegro, Rio Grande do Sul (in the Altkolonie region of the state), grew up speaking Portuguese alongside Hunsrik.

According to supermodel Gisele Bündchen, while her parents and her parents' siblings still speak Hunsrik, she has forgotten all of it herself.

During an interview in 2011, renowned Brazilian writer, translator, and international relations professor Aldyr Schlee talked in detail about having been an eyewitness to the repression of Hunsrik in his native state of Rio Grande do Sul during World War II.

== Phonology ==
=== Vowels ===
| | Front | | Central | | Back | |
| | short | long | short | long | short | long |
|---|---|---|---|---|---|---|
| Close | i | iː | | | u | uː |
| Close-mid | e | eː | | | o | oː |
| Mid | | | ə | | | |
| Open-mid | ɛ | ɛː | | | ɔ | ɔː |
| Open | | | a | (aː) | | |

=== Consonants ===
| | | Labial | Alveolar | Postalveolar | Palatal | Velar | Glottal |
|---|---|---|---|---|---|---|---|
| Nasal | | /m/ ⟨m⟩ ⟨m⟩ | /n/ ⟨n⟩ ⟨n⟩ | | | /ŋ/ ⟨ng, n⟩ ⟨ng, n⟩ | |
| Plosive | fortis | /p/ ⟨p⟩ ⟨b⟩ | /t/ ⟨t⟩ ⟨d⟩ | | | /k/ ⟨k⟩ ⟨g⟩ | |
| Plosive | lenis | /pʰ/ ⟨ph⟩ ⟨p⟩ | /tʰ/ ⟨th⟩ ⟨t⟩ | | | /kʰ/ ⟨kh⟩ ⟨k⟩ | |
| Affricate | | | /ts/ ⟨ts⟩ ⟨z, tz⟩ | /tʃ/ ⟨tx⟩ ⟨tsch⟩ | | | |
| Fricative | voiceless | /f/ ⟨f⟩ ⟨f, v⟩ | /s/ ⟨s⟩ ⟨s, ss⟩ | /ʃ/ ⟨x⟩ ⟨sch⟩ | /ç/ ⟨c⟩ ⟨ch⟩ | /χ~x/ ⟨ch⟩ ⟨ch⟩ | /h/ ⟨h⟩ ⟨h⟩ |
| Fricative | voiced | /v/ ⟨w⟩ ⟨w⟩ | | | | | |
| Approximant | | | /l/ ⟨l⟩ ⟨l⟩ | | /j/ ⟨y⟩ ⟨j⟩ | | |
| Rhotic | | | /ɾ/ ⟨r⟩ ⟨r⟩ | | | | |

Orthography between plain angle brackets follows Wiesemann's orthography and between italic angle brackets follows Altenhofen et al.'s orthography.

The contrast between plosives is not of voice, but of articulatory force, a phenomenon observed in some other dialects of German.

== Orthography ==
W stands for Wiesemann, A for Altenhofen et al. and B for Boll.

| IPA | W | A | B |
|---|---|---|---|
| a | a | | |
| ɔː~aː | aa | oo | aa |
| ai̯ | ay | ei | |
| au̯ | au | | |
| ə | e | | |
| eː | ee | e, ee, eh | |
| e~ɛ | ë | e | ë, ä |
| ei̯ | ey | ee | e, ee |
| i | i | | |
| iː | ii | i, ie | i, ih, ie |
| o~ɔ | o | | |
| oː | oo | o, oh | o, oh, oo |
| ɔi̯ | oy | eu | |
| u | u | | |
| uː | uu | u, uh | u, uh, uu |

== Sample ==
The passages of Luke 23:1-5 in Hunsrik, according to Dr. Ursula Wiesemann's orthography:

23 Too sin ti kanse layt uf kextii, hon Yeesus pis Pilatos kenom un hon aan kefang aan se këwe un saare: 2 Mëyer hon too te man aan ketrof unser folek am uf hëtse. Tee is te keeche em Khayser xtayer petsaale un saat wëyer te Mësiias un Kheenich. 3 Too hot te Pilatos kefroot: Pixt tu te Yute sayne Kheenich? Is woer, hot Yeesus keantwort. 4 Too hot Pilatos fer te hooche priister un tsum folek kesaat: Ich khan khee xult an tëm man fine! 5 Awer tii hon aan kehal un hon kesaat: Tee tuut unortnung aan richte unich em folek mit sayn untricht iweraal in Yuteeya. In Kalileeya hot er aan kefang, un yëts is er too pay uns!

The same Bible section in Hunsrik, according to Dr. Altenhofen's orthography:

23 Do sinn die ganze Leit uffgestieh, honn Jesus bis Pilatos genomm unn honn ongefang onzegewwe unn soohte: 2 Mea honn do der Mann ongetroff unser Vollek om Uffhetze. Der is degeche’m Kaiser Steier bezoohle unn sooht weer der Messias unn Keenich. 3 Do hot der Pilatos gefroht: Bist du der Judde seine Keenich? Is wohr, hot Jesus geantwott. 4 Do hot Pilatos fer der hoche Priester unn zum Vollek gesooht: Ich kann kee Schuld on dem Mann finne! 5 Awer die honn ongehall unn honn gesooht: Der tut Unoddnung onrichte unninch’em Vollek mit sein Untricht iwerall in Judea. In Galilea hot er ongefang, un jetz is er do bei uns!

The same Bible section in Luxembourgish: (Note: Both Hunsrik and Luxembourgish are related Moselle Franconian dialects.)

23 Du si si alleguer opgestanen an hunn hie virun de Pilatus bruecht. 2 Si hunn ugefaangen, hien unzekloen: Mir hu festgestallt, datt hien d’Vollek opgestëppelt huet: Hien huet hinne verbueden, fir dem Caesar Steieren ze bezuelen, a vu sech selwer seet hien, datt hien de Messias ass, e Kinnek. 3 Bass du de Kinnek vun de Judden? Huet de Pilatus hie gefrot. Du sees et, huet hien him geäntwert. 4 Doropshi sot de Pilatus zu deniewescht Priister an dem Vollek: Ech fanne keng Schold un dësem Mann. 5 Mee si hu sech drop behaapt: Hien hetzt d’Vollek mat senger Léier uechter ganz Judea op. Hien huet a Galilea ugefaangen an elo ass hien hei!

In Standard German:

23 Und die ganze Versammlung stand auf, und sie führten ihn vor Pilatus. 2 Sie fingen aber an, ihn zu verklagen und sprachen: Wir haben gefunden, dass dieser das Volk verführt und es davon abhalten will, dem Kaiser die Steuern zu zahlen. Er behauptet, er sei Christus, der König. 3 Da fragte ihn Pilatus und sprach: Bist du der König der Juden? Er antwortete ihm und sprach: Du sagst es! 4 Da sprach Pilatus zu den obersten Priestern und der Volksmenge: Ich finde keine Schuld an diesem Menschen! 5 Sie aber bestanden darauf und sprachen: Er wiegelt das Volk auf, indem er in ganz Judäa lehrt, angefangen in Galiläa bis hierher!

And in English:

23 And the whole multitude of them arose, and led him unto Pilate. 2 And they began to accuse him, saying, "We found this fellow perverting the nation, and forbidding to give tribute to Caesar, saying that he himself is Christ a King." 3 And Pilate asked him, saying, "Art thou the King of the Jews?" And he answered him and said, "Thou sayest it." 4 Then said Pilate to the chief priests and to the people, "I find no fault in this man." 5 And they were the more fierce, saying, "He stirreth up the people, teaching throughout all Jewry, beginning from Galilee to this place."

== See also ==
- Geographical distribution of German speakers
- Brazilian German
- German Brazilians
- Heimat (film series)
- Transylvanian Saxon, another dialect similar to Moselle Franconian
