= Rhein-Mosel =

Municipality in Rhineland-Palatinate, Germany

- Verbandsgemeinde
- Location of Rhein-Mosel within Mayen-Koblenz district
- Interactive map of Rhein-Mosel
- Location within Germany Location within Rhineland-Palatinate
- Coordinates: 50°18′N 7°27′E
- Country: Germany
- State: Rhineland-Palatinate
- District: Mayen-Koblenz
- Seat: Kobern-Gondorf
- Subdivisions: 18 municipalities

Area
  - Total: 164.31 km^{2} (63.44 sq mi)

Population (2025-12-31)
  - Total: 26,693
  - Density: 162.46/km^{2} (420.76/sq mi)
- Time zone: UTC+01:00 (CET)
  - Summer (DST): UTC+02:00 (CEST)
- Website: www.vg-rhein-mosel.de

Rhein-Mosel is a Verbandsgemeinde ("collective municipality") in the district Mayen-Koblenz, in Rhineland-Palatinate, Germany. It is situated along the lower course of the river Moselle, south-west of Koblenz. The seat of the municipality is in Kobern-Gondorf. It was formed on 1 July 2014 by the merger of the former Verbandsgemeinden Untermosel and Rhens.

The Verbandsgemeinde Rhein-Mosel consists of the following Ortsgemeinden ("local municipalities"):

1. Alken
2. Brey
3. Brodenbach
4. Burgen
5. Dieblich
6. Hatzenport
7. Kobern-Gondorf
8. Lehmen
9. Löf
10. Macken
11. Niederfell
12. Nörtershausen
13. Oberfell
14. Rhens
15. Spay
16. Waldesch
17. Winningen
18. Wolken
