= Rhene (Diemel) =

River in Germany

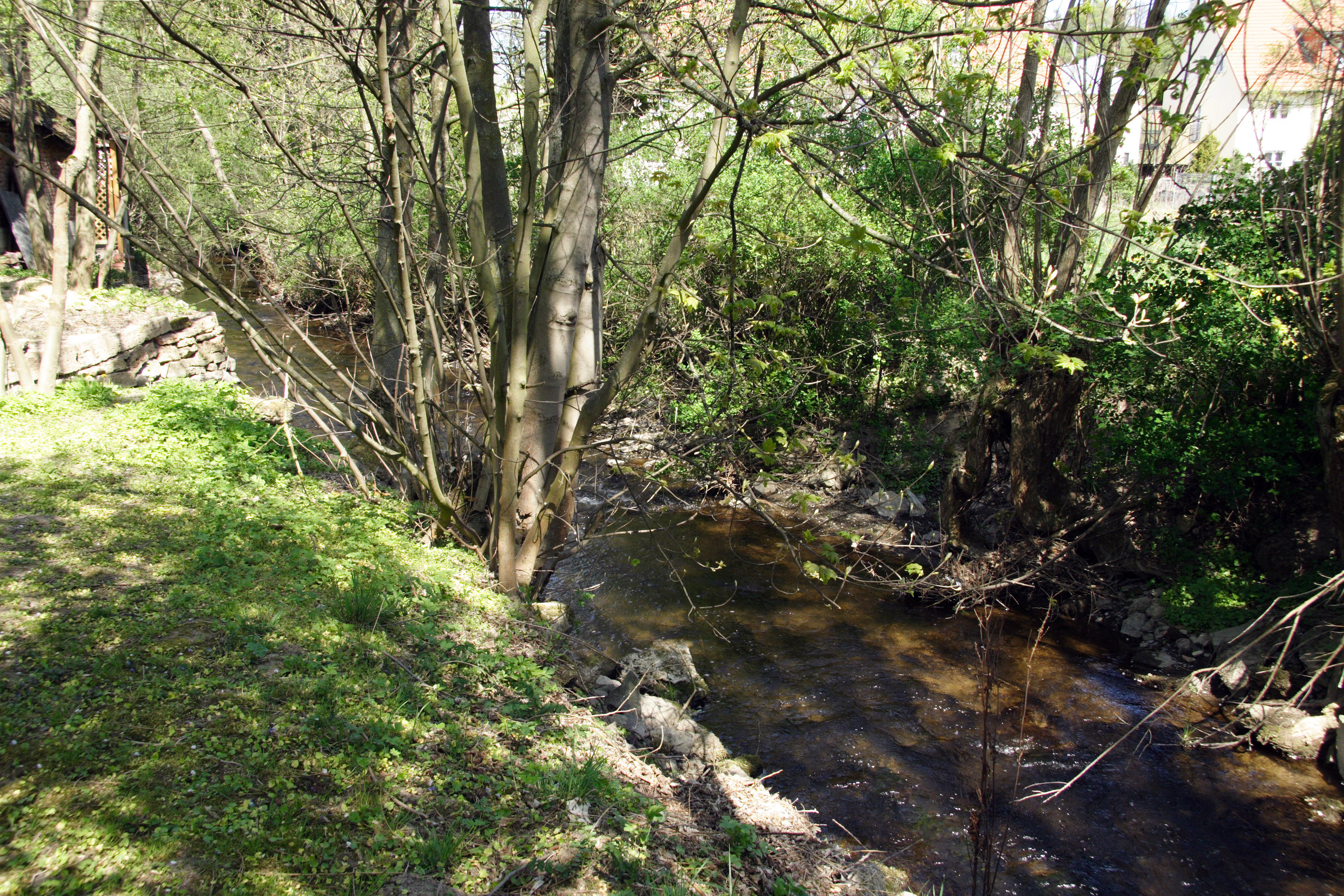

Location
- Country: Germany
- State: Hesse

Physical characteristics
- Source
  - location: Widdehagen
  - coordinates: 51.3046°N 8.7677°E
- Mouth
  - location: near Padberg
  - coordinates: 51.4007°N 8.7821°E

Rhene is a river of Hesse, Germany. It is a right tributary of the Diemel.

== See also ==
- List of rivers of Hesse
