= Santa Maria do Herval =

Municipality of Rio Grande do Sul, Brazil

Santa Maria do Herval Teewald (Hunsrick)
- Municipality
- Municipality of Santa Maria do Herval
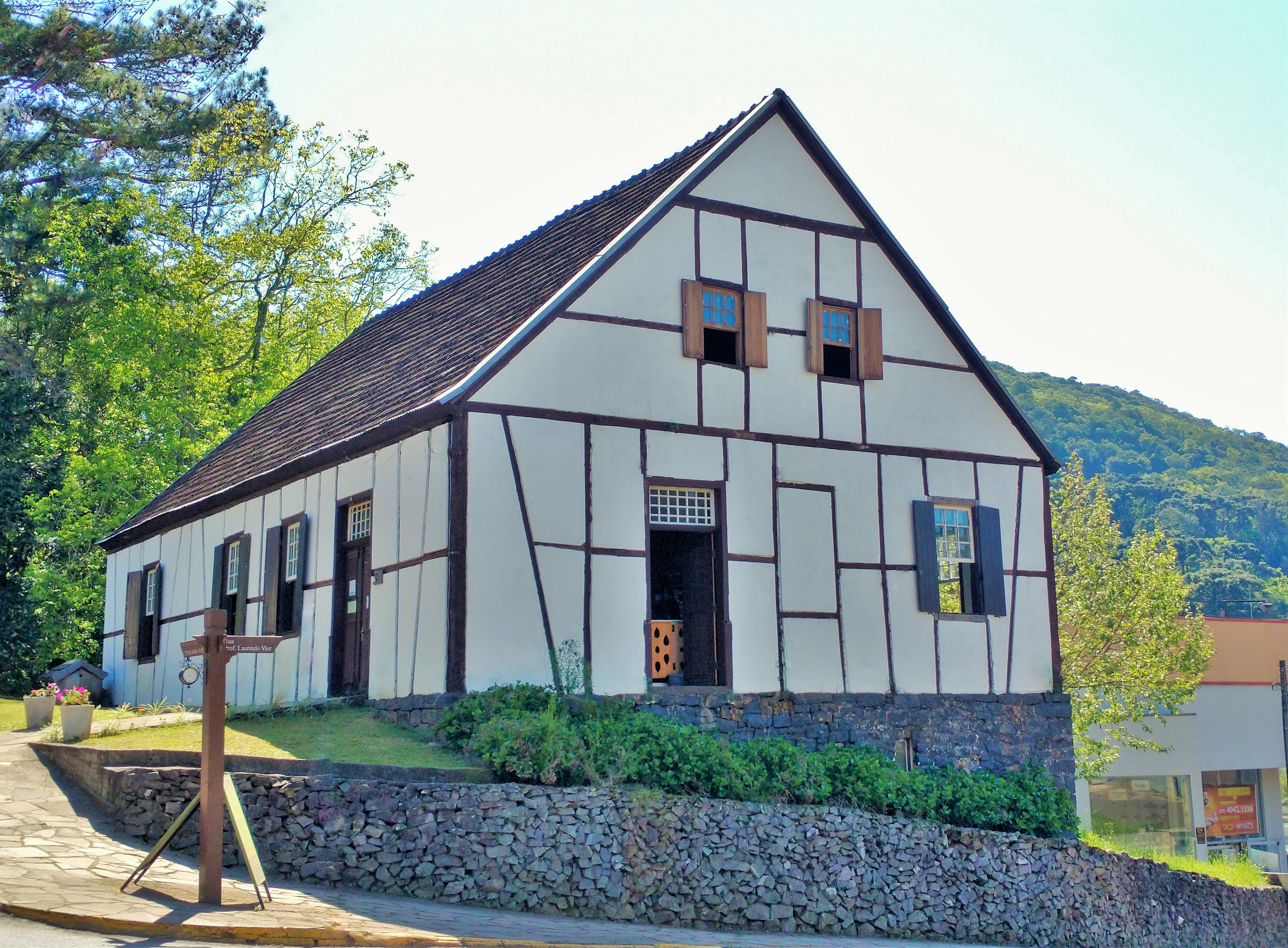

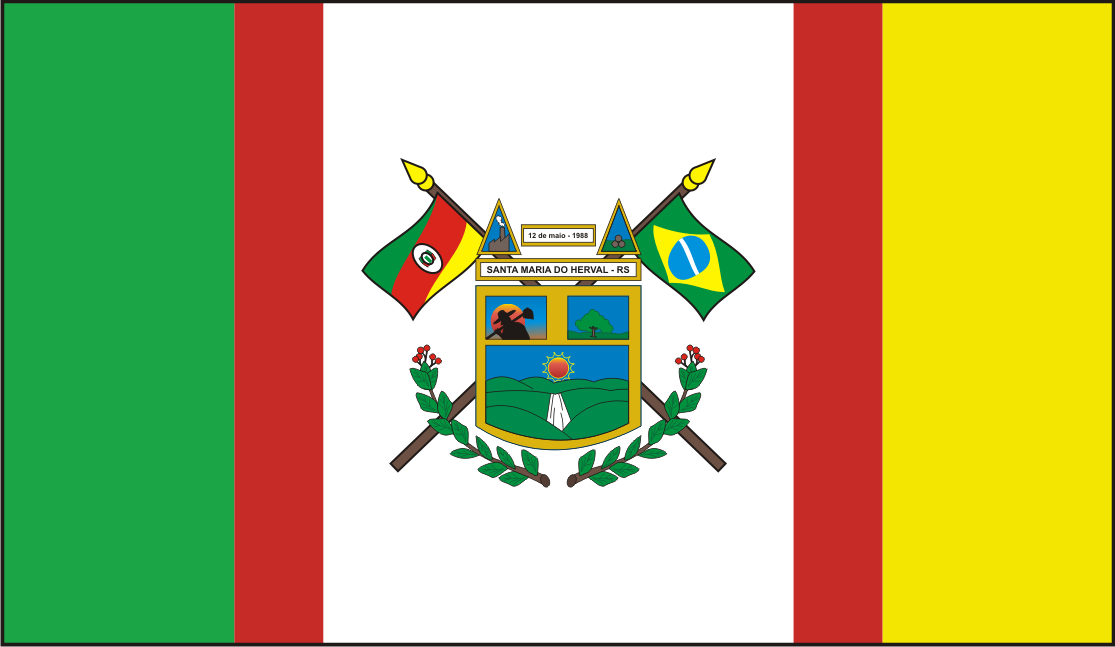
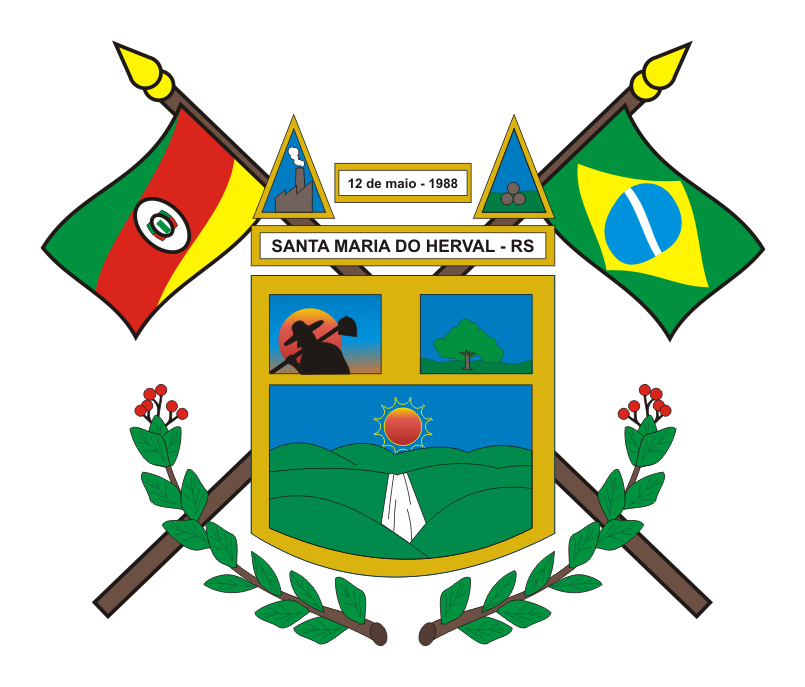
- Flag Coat of arms

- Location within Rio Grande do Sul
- Coordinates: 29°29′52″S 50°59′34″W
- Country: Brazil
- State: Rio Grande do Sul

Population (2020)
  - Total: 6,364
- Time zone: UTC−3 (BRT)

Santa Maria do Herval (Hunsrick: Teewald) is a municipality in the state of Rio Grande do Sul, Brazil.

Santa Maria do Herval is one of 17 municipalities in Brazil where Hunsrick is an official language.

== See also ==
- List of municipalities in Rio Grande do Sul
