= Lack-of-fit test =

In statistics, a lack-of-fit test is any of many tests of a null hypothesis that a proposed statistical model fits well. See:

- Goodness of fit
- Lack-of-fit sum of squares
