= Brey, Rhineland-Palatinate =

- Municipality
- Coat of arms

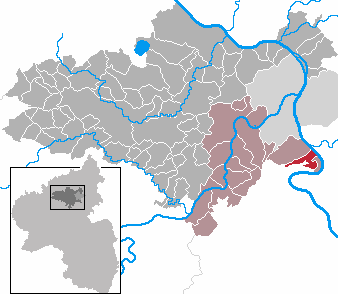
- Location of Brey, Rhineland-Palatinate within Mayen-Koblenz district
- Interactive map of Brey, Rhineland-Palatinate
- Location within Germany Location within Rhineland-Palatinate
- Coordinates: 50°16′25″N 7°37′56″E
- Country: Germany
- State: Rhineland-Palatinate
- District: Mayen-Koblenz
- Municipal assoc.: Rhein-Mosel

Government
  - Mayor (2019–24): Manfred Bier

Area
  - Total: 6.46 km^{2} (2.49 sq mi)
- Elevation: 98 m (322 ft)

Population (2025-12-31)
  - Total: 1,482
  - Density: 229/km^{2} (594/sq mi)
- Time zone: UTC+01:00 (CET)
  - Summer (DST): UTC+02:00 (CEST)
- Postal codes: 56321
- Dialling codes: 02628
- Vehicle registration: MYK
- Website: www.brey-am-rhein.de

Brey (German pronunciation: [bʁaɪ]) is a municipality in the district of Mayen-Koblenz in Rhineland-Palatinate, western Germany. It has a population of 1,446 (Dec. 2020).
