= Lehmen =

- Municipality
- Coat of arms

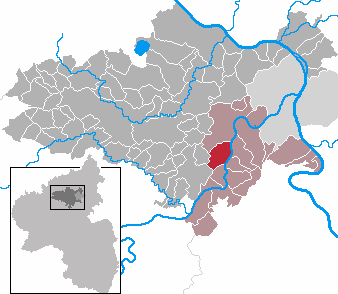
- Location of Lehmen within Mayen-Koblenz district
- Interactive map of Lehmen
- Location within Germany Location within Rhineland-Palatinate
- Coordinates: 50°17′3″N 7°27′14″E
- Country: Germany
- State: Rhineland-Palatinate
- District: Mayen-Koblenz
- Municipal assoc.: Rhein-Mosel
- Subdivisions: 2

Government
  - Mayor (2019–24): Arnold Waschgler

Area
  - Total: 10.25 km^{2} (3.96 sq mi)
- Elevation: 100 m (330 ft)

Population (2025-12-31)
  - Total: 1,270
  - Density: 124/km^{2} (321/sq mi)
- Time zone: UTC+01:00 (CET)
  - Summer (DST): UTC+02:00 (CEST)
- Postal codes: 56332
- Dialling codes: 02607
- Vehicle registration: MYK
- Website: www.gemeinde-lehmen.de

Lehmen (German pronunciation: [ˈleːmən]) is a municipality in the district of Mayen-Koblenz in Rhineland-Palatinate, western Germany.
