= Thurant Castle =

Coordinates: 50°14′53.65″N 7°27′10.48″E

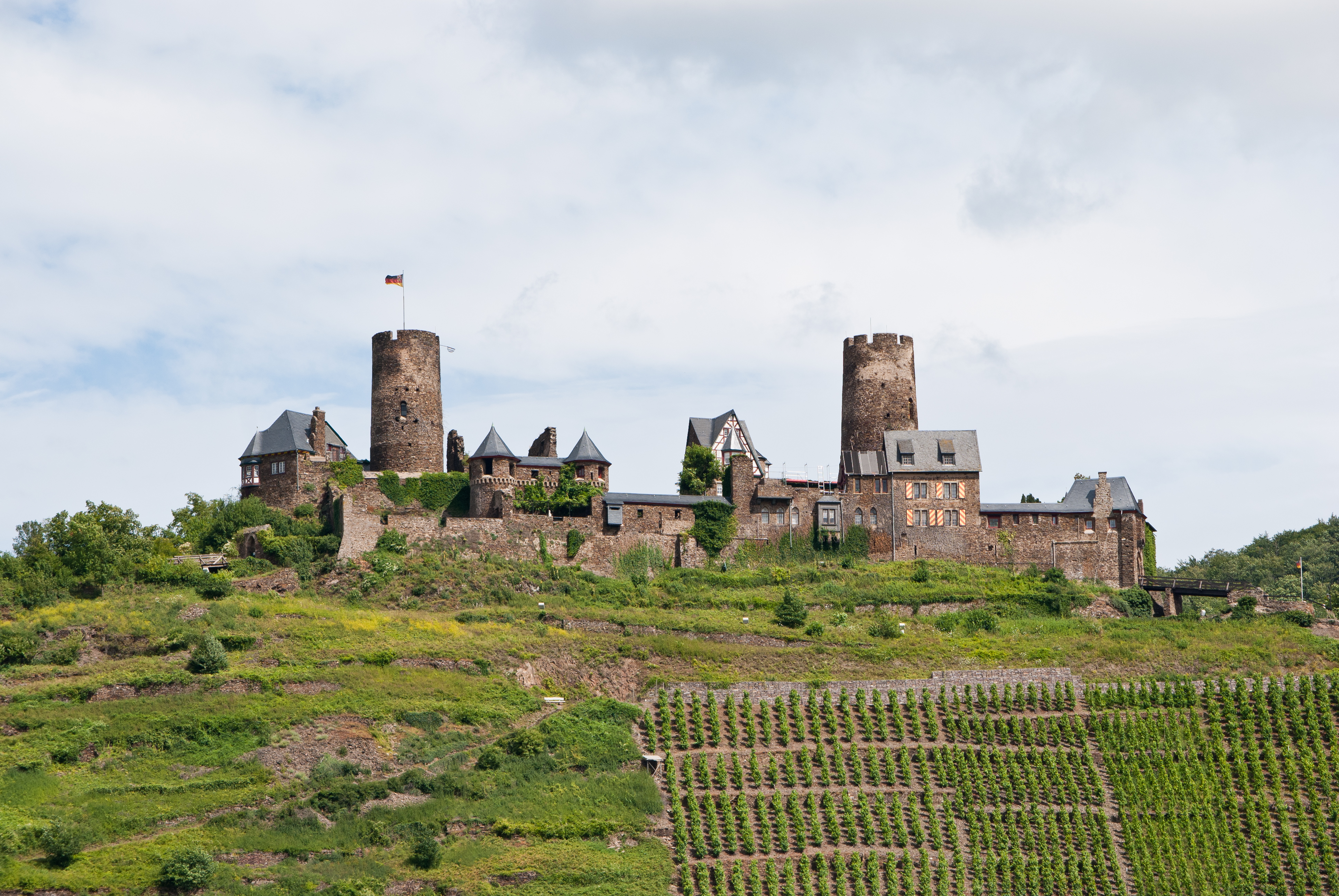
Thurant Castle from the northwest

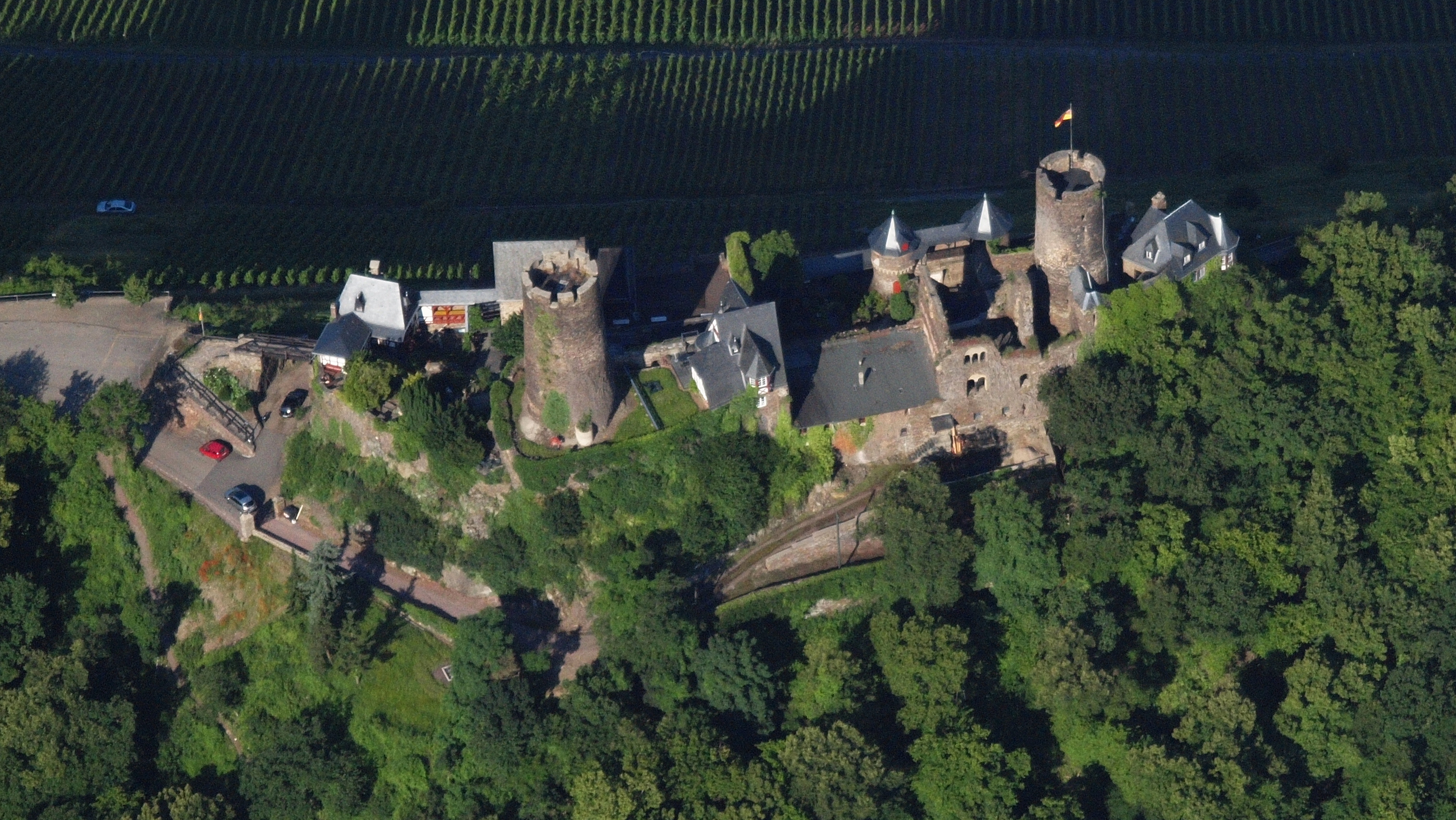
Aerial photograph of the castle from the east

The ruins of the Thurant Castle (German: Burg Thurant, also Thurandt or Thurand) stand on a wide slate hill spur above the villages of Alken on the Moselle in Germany. The castle is in the district of Mayen-Koblenz in Rhineland-Palatinate and belongs to the spur castle type. Vine gardens on the sunniest slope.

From the mid-13th century the archbishops of Cologne and Trier were joint owners and had their respective property managed by burgraves. As a result, each half of the castle had its own bergfried, living/domestic buildings and entrance.

From the early 16th century the double castle gradually fell into disrepair and was made a complete ruin during the destruction wrought by the War of the Palatine Succession. Robert Allmers (1872–1951) from Varel, co-founder of the Hansa Automobil company and, from 1914, director of Bremen's Hansa Lloyd factories, bought the site in 1911 and had part of it rebuilt. The castle is in private hands, but may be visited from March to mid-November for a fee.

Under to the Heritage Monument Conservation Act of the state, the whole site is a protected monument so is incorporated into the state monument list. It is a protected cultural object under the Hague Convention, bearing its blue and white signs.

== History ==
Pottery finds point to a Roman settlement on the hill spur, but the first record of the place dates to the year 1209.

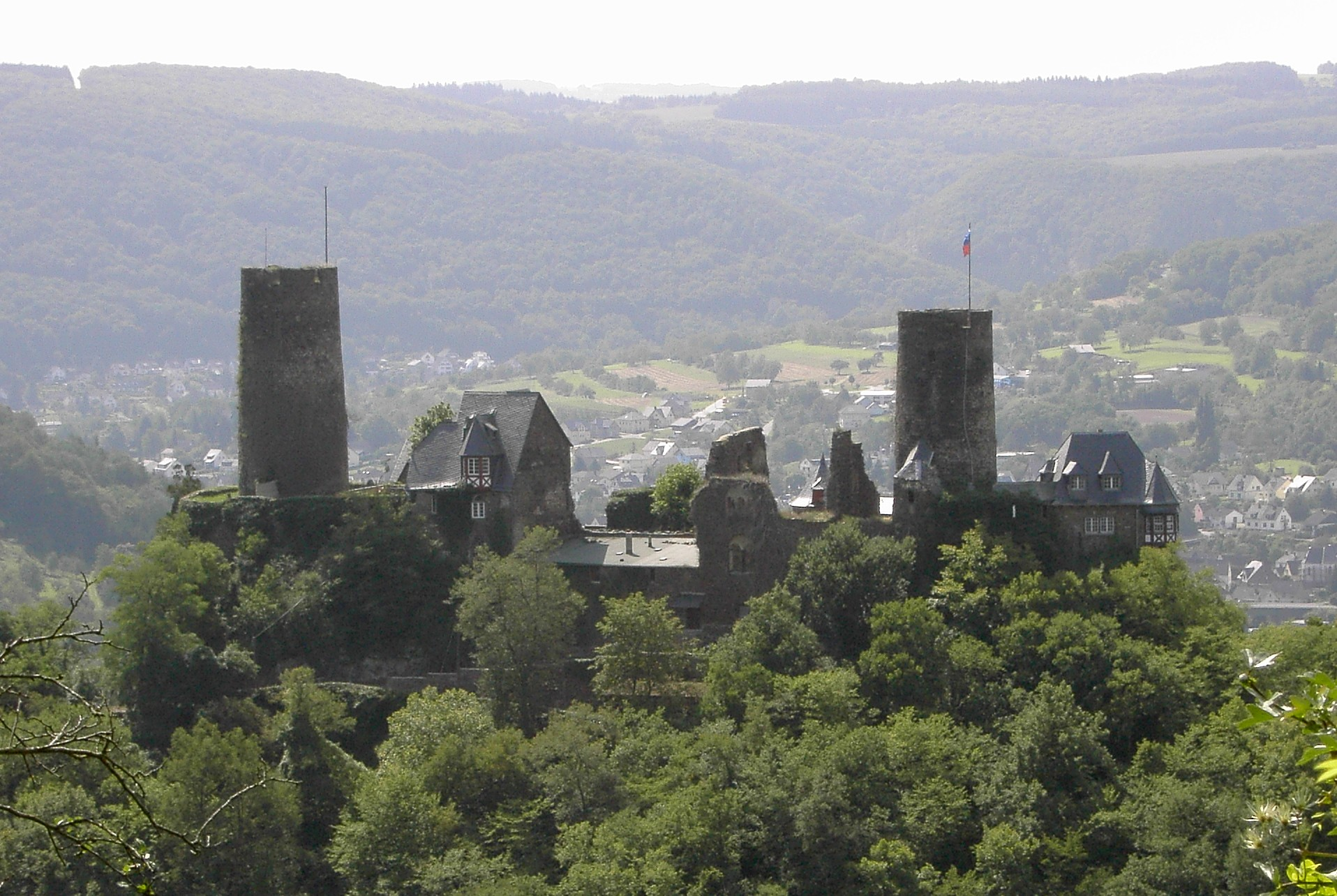
View of the castle from the Bleidenberg at Oberfell

Count Palatine Henry I the Tall from the House of Welf probably had a fortification built on the present site between 1198 and 1206 in order to secure the claims of his brother, Emperor Otto IV, in the Moselle region. According to tradition, he named the hill castle after Toron Castle near Tyros in present-day Lebanon, which he had besieged in vain during the Battle of Barbarossa during the Third Crusade. After Count Palatine Henry II the Younger died without male issue in 1214, Emperor Frederick II gave the castle and the village of Alken as an imperial fief together with the Palatinate to the House of Wittelsbach who were loyal to the Hohenstaufens.

Being relatively near Trier, the castle was also, however, claimed by the archbishops of Cologne and Trier. In 1216 Engelbert I of Cologne succeeded in taking the castle by force. Although Pope Honorius III protested against this act, Engelbert retained possession of his prize until his death in November 1225, when the castle went back into the hands of the Counts Palatine by Rhine. Following that, Duke Otto II of Bavaria appointed a knight, Berlewin, named Zurn, as the burgrave. Because Berlewin conducted himself as a robber baron and raided the Trier Land from his castle, Arnold II of Isenburg and Conrad of Hochstaden joined forces and besieged the castle in 1246 in the so-called Great Feud (Große Fehde). In 1248 the place was captured by them and, on 17 November that year, an expiatory treaty (Sühnevertrag) was signed that has unusually survived to the present day. In the treaty, Electoral Palatinate gives up possession of Thurant Castle and the associated estate of Alken in favour of the two archbishops.

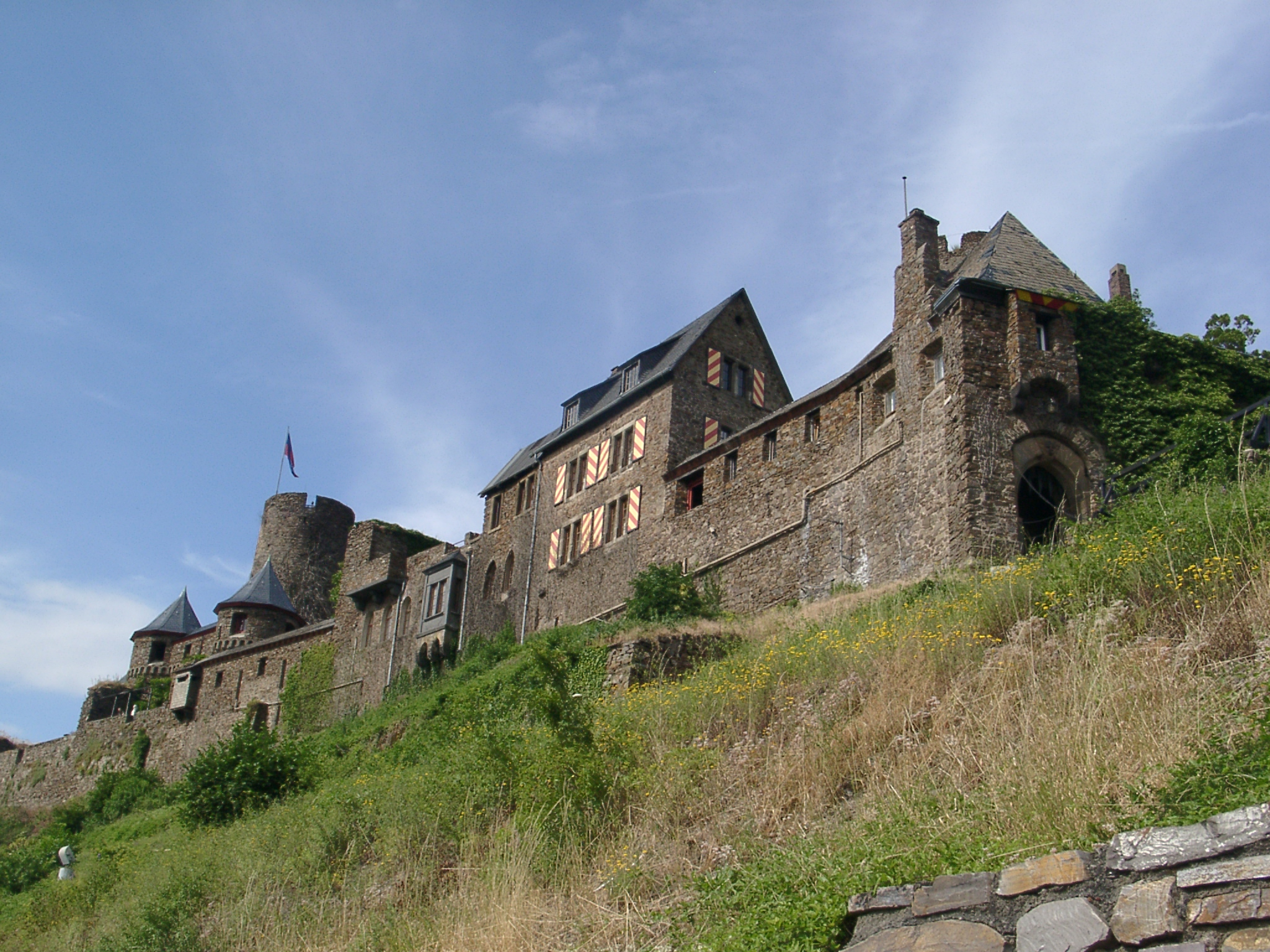
West side of Thurant Castle

The archbishops divided the site into a Trier and a Cologne half which were separated by a wall and each managed by a burgrave appointed by their respective primates. Each half had a separate entrance, its own residential and domestic buildings and a bergfried, today called the Trier Tower (Trierer Turm) and Cologne Tower (Kölner Turm). In the 14th and 15th centuries, both parts of the castle were not only Afterlehen fiefs, but also mortgaged properties (Pfandobjekte). Among the noble families who occupied the castle from the early 14th century were the families of von Schöneck, von Winningen, von Eltz and von der Reck. From 1495 the lords of Wiltberg were one of the vassals. They used the castle, which was becoming a ruin as early as 1542, as a stone quarry, in order to build a country house in Alken, the Wiltberg’sche Schloss or Wiltburg.

During the War of the Palatine Succession the castle suffered further destruction in 1689 at the hand of French troops and the castle finally became a ruin. Only the two bergfriede and a residential house from the 16th century were largely undamaged.

Geheimrat Robert Allmer purchased the site in 1911 and had several of its elements rebuilt in 1915/16. Since 1973 it has been a joint private residence of the Allmers and Wulf families.

== Description ==
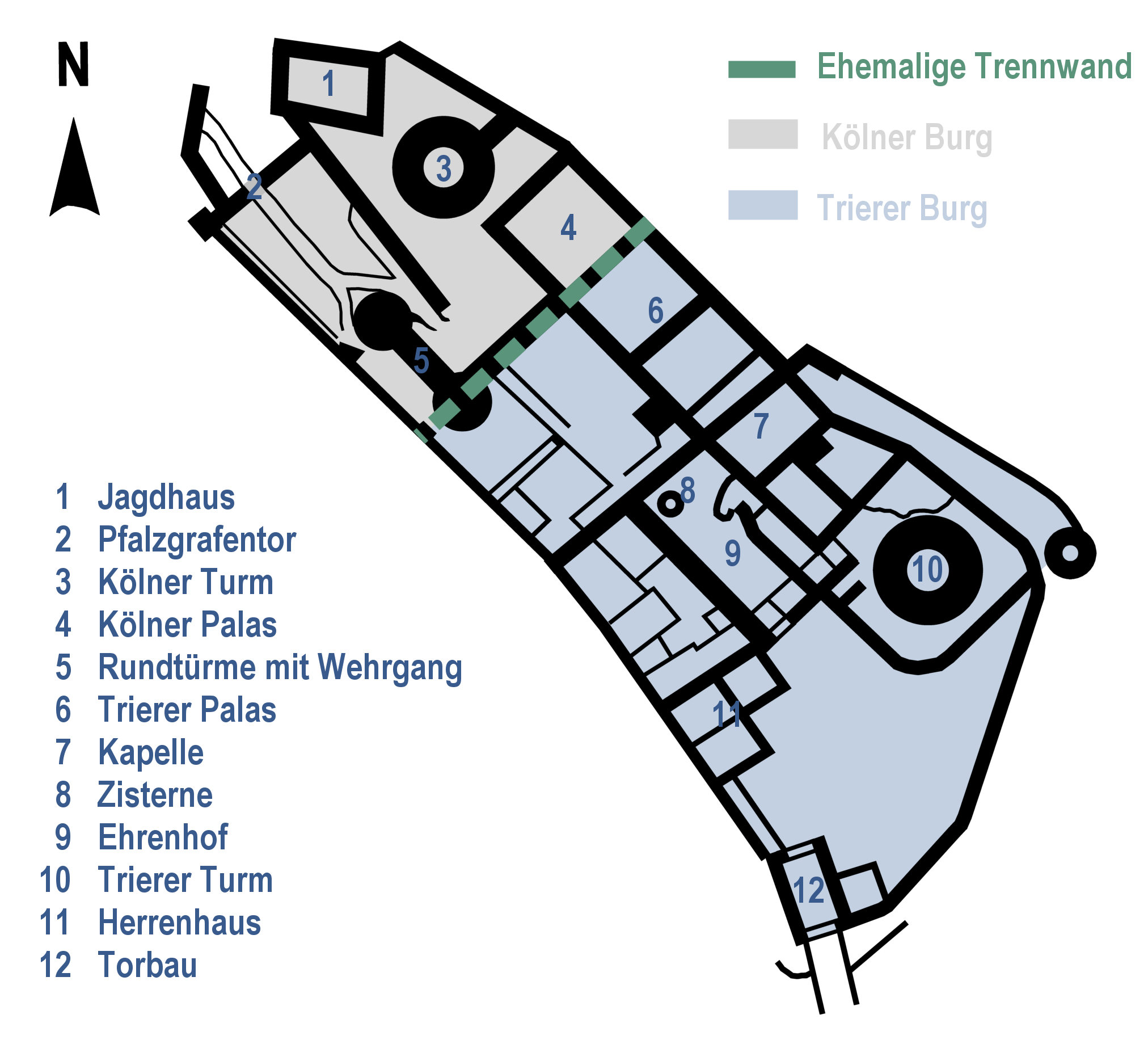
Schematic ground plan of the castle during the Middle Ages

The majority of the original building stock still preserved today dates to the period after 1248. The gatehouse was only built in the course of a partial reconstruction of the castle at the beginning of the 20th century, while a residential building, the so-called manor house, was rebuilt between 1960 and 1962 after its destruction in the Second World War.

The entire complex is surrounded by a ring wall and protected by a neck moat on its southern side.

=== Trier Castle ===
The Trier part of the castle complex can be reached via a gate building, to which a wooden bridge spanning the neck moat leads. It is adjoined by a large inner courtyard, which was redesigned into a rock garden by Robert Allmers in the 20th century. From there, the 20-metre-high Trier Tower can be reached, which stands to the north of it on a raised plateau. With its walls three metres thick at the base, it now serves as a water reservoir and cannot be visited.

On the west side of the courtyard, facing the Moselle, is the Herrenhaus, a residential building still in use today, rebuilt between 1960 and 1962 on old foundations, having been destroyed during the Second World War by American artillery fire and a subsequent fire. At the north-western corner of the building, a battlements on the Moselle side begins on the western circular wall, which continues into the Cologne part of the castle.

A second, smaller gate leads from the inner courtyard into the cour d'honneur to the northwest, in which the only surviving of the castle's former three cisterns is located. Its shaft is about 20 metres deep. The cour d'honneur used to be enclosed on its north-western side by a thick wall, of which only a section of full height and thickness remains today.

In the northern corner of the cour d'honneur is a three-storey building, the top floor of which was built in Fachwerkbaubau and today serves as a holiday home together with the first floor. On the ground floor is the castle chapel with old wall and ceiling frescoes, whose furnishings include a baroque altar from 1779 and a baptismal font from 1515. The building is adjoined to the north-east by the preserved ground floor of the Trier Palas.

=== Cologne castle ===
In former times, the Cologne half of the castle could only be reached via a narrow wooden bridge and the adjoining Palatine Gate at the north-western corner of the complex. Adjacent to the gate is an inner courtyard, at the south-eastern end of which are two round towers connected by a covered battlements between them. Inside the southern tower, murals have been preserved showing the coats of arms of all the owners and feudatories of the castle.

Via the former boundary wall to the Trier half of the castle, the southern round tower is connected to the ruins of the Cologne Palace from the 16th century on the east side of the complex. Formerly housing the Knights' Hall, the building was destroyed by Napoleonic troops in 1812/13, so that today, apart from the cellar, only the ground floor is completely preserved. Of the higher storeys, the gable walls with chimney recesses and the north-eastern outer wall have been partially preserved. It has window openings in the style of the Late Romanesque, which, however, do not belong to the original building substance, but were only added at the beginning of the 20th century.

At the northern end of the castle stands the so-called hunting lodge with two tourelles, which, like the manor house, was rebuilt on old foundation walls. Its ground floor is occupied by a single room with dark wood panelling and a beamed ceiling, which serves as an exhibition room for hunting trophies, armour, old weapons and finds from excavations. A covered walkway connects the building with the Cologne Tower, the first floor of which used to serve as a dungeon. Today, torture instruments can be seen there. The tower can be climbed as a lookout tower and offers a very good view over the Moselle valley.
