= Hunsrückisch =

Dialect of German

- Native to: Germany
- Region: Hunsrück region, Rhineland-Palatinate
- Language family: Indo-European: Germanic; West Germanic; High German; Central German; Rhenish Franconian / Moselle Franconian; Hunsrückisch
- Writing system: Latin (German alphabet)

Language codes
- ISO 639-3: –

Wenn der Rapp bleht in Piddaschwald, a poem in the dialect of Peterswald-Löffelscheid

Hunsrückisch is a German dialect spoken in the Hunsrück region of Germany (Rhineland-Palatinate). This mountainous region of Germany has long been an exporter of emigrants to Brazil, United States, Canada, Australia and other parts of the world.

Hunsrückisch was spoken in Edgar Reitz's acclaimed television series Heimat.

== Geographical distribution ==
A poem in Mastershausen dialect

=== Germany ===
Whilst the Hunsrück region of Germany is well-defined, the distribution of Hunsrückisch itself is less so. On the one hand, the dialect extends beyond the Hunsrück area, but there are clear linguistic differences between the Hunsrückisch spoken in one locality and in another, and no uniform form of the dialect exists. That is made more difficult by the lack of written resources for the dialect. Since the 1990s, there has been an ongoing attempt to more scientifically document local dialects in the Mittelrheinischer Sprachatlas. The Rheinisches Wörterbuch entries of 1928–1971 have also been fully digitalised since then by the University of Trier.

As with almost all German dialects, the Hunsrückische dialect can be subdivided into many small local dialects, which each village having its own strand. The small-scale divisions of this linguistic area stem from how kingdoms in the Hunsrück area were often divided with borders that even cut through villages. The religious divisions in the predominantly protestant or catholic areas also contributed towards this linguistic separation.

A considerable and accelerated reversal of the active use of the Hunsrückisch dialect has also been noted. Younger generations sometimes no longer speak dialect and rarely understand unique words pertinent to that dialect. Societies dedicated to preserving local culture and history, as well as individuals themselves, have been trying to stem this trend via modern communication and documentation methods.

=== Brazil ===
There is a variation of the dialect in southern Brazil and in the southeastern state of Espírito Santo (municipalities of Marechal Floriano, Domingos Martins and Santa Leopoldina), named Hunsrik.

Throughout its almost 200-year history in southern Brazil and Espírito Santo, Hunsrückisch has been greatly influenced by other German dialects such as East Pomeranian, Swabian, and Austro-Bavarian; by other immigrant languages; and by Portuguese. Through Brazilian Portuguese, it has also incorporated Amerindian terminology, notably for fauna, flora and toponyms.

Brazilian Hunsrik is spoken in the states of Rio Grande do Sul, the nearby state of Santa Catarina, in other parts of southern Brazil like Paraná, and in the Southeast region such as Espírito Santo and São Paulo. It's the second most spoken language in Brazil, after Portuguese.

== Features ==
=== Phonology ===
Hunsrückisch can roughly be classed under two dialect sub-groups. The first of these is the Rhenish Franconian languages, for Hunsrückisch spoken from the Nahe (Rhine) until approximately just beyond Kastellaun. The second of these groups is Moselle Franconian, for Hunsrückisch spoken between Kastellaun and Moselle. The main linguistic characteristic which separates these two groups of Hunsrückisch is the dat/das divide. In the North, such as in Idar-Oberstein, Gemünden, Kirchberg, and Boppard, the definite article is pronounced dat. Roland Martin states, however, that a more important division between the groups is his proposed Bad Sobernheim Isogloss which focuses on the east and west. To the east, one hears Herrd (Hirte, "shepherd)", Gorrjel (Gurgel, "throat"), and Rerre (Räder, "wheels"), whereas to the west Heerd, Goorjel, and Rierer are heard. Insertion of an epenthetic [ə] or [i] also occurs, with Dorf (village) becoming Dooref, Kirche (church) becoming Keerisch, and Berg (mountain) becoming Beerisch.

Georg Diener references other phonetic differences in different isoglosses. For example, in the west of Hunsrück o and eu are used, with u and au being used in the region east of the Mastershausen-Buch-Mannebach-Nörtershausen line: Bruure (Bruder, "brother"), Hau (Heu, "hay"). In the near east such as in Bubach, but not in Simmern, r is also pronounced as an apical consonant.

In Hunsrückisch d/t is often replaced with r, such as in Peere for Peter, or Fäärerre for Federn (feathers). When appearing between two vowels g is not pronounced, hence Aue (Augen "eyes") and saan (sagen "to say"). The dialect is also notable for its openness of the mouth when being spoken, as evident in a local saying from Bubach:

- Hunsrückisch: Bräämerre: Et git kä brärer Blaad as en bräd, bräd Bräämerreblaad.
- Standard German: Brombeeren: Es gibt kein breiteres Blatt als ein breites, breites, Brombeerblatt.
- English: There is no wider leaf than a wide, wide, blackberry leaf.

=== Grammar ===
The grammatical rules of Hunsrückisch resemble those of Standard German.

==== Gender ====
In contrast to the Standard language, Bach (stream) and Salat (salad) are feminine and not masculine—die Bach, die Salaad instead of der Bach, der Salat. Feminine die Brille (glasses) and die Butter become masculine de Brill and de Bodder in Hunsrückisch.

Female referents are usually of the masculine gender, such as de Marri (Maria), de Suffi (Sophia). Die Fraa (Frau "woman") becomes neuter, like in dat Fraamensch (lit. "the woman-human"), when appended with -mensch. Diminutives of women's names are also neuter like in Standard German—dat Kattche (Katharina)—but are also often complemented with the name of the locality in which they reside, or with a family name.

==== Tenses ====
In Hunsrückisch the perfect tenses are predominantly used. The preterite is reserved for only a small number of verbs, such as saht (sagte "said") and fung (fing, "caught"). Conjugation largely occurs on the basis of Standard German conjugation.

==== Cases ====
As is extant in Standard German, the Nominative, Accusative, and Dative are present in Hunsrückisch. The genitive case, as often comes to be in German dialects, is not used and is replaced with the dative plus a form of the third-person personal pronoun. Thus dessen Bruder becomes dämm seine Brorer.

==== Plural Formation ====
In all cases except one, plural formation is identical to that of Standard German. The only exception occurs when the Standard German plural form is -en, in which case the plural in Hunsrückisch is -e.

- die Zeitung, die Zeitungen (the newspaper, the newspapers) > die Zeidung, die Zeidunge.

=== Regionalisms ===
A number of words occur in Hunsrückisch which are either not found in Standard German, or occur rarely/in different contexts in Standard German.

Hunsrückisch	Standard German	English	Notes
Hinkel	Huhn	chicken	
Beddseicher	Bettnässer	bed-wetter	
Bischordna	Garten	garden	from French jardin
Geheischnis/Gehäischnis	Geborgenheit	emotional safety, intimacy	from German hegen, to cherish
Grumbeere/Krumbier/Gumbi	Kartoffeln	potatoes	related to "Grundbirnen" ground pears
Maje-gehe/Meie-gehe	abends zum Nachbarn zum Besuch und zur Unterhaltung gehen	to visit one's neighbours in the evening for a chat	
Muskouri	Banane	banana	until the late 1800s the Banana was relatively unknown in Hunsrück and originally called gelbe Fettbohne (yellow fat-bean). Muskouri arose in the early 20th century from the erroneous belief that bananas were cultivated in Greece
leppsch	fad, geschmacklos	stale, tasteless	
ei allemoo(l)	ja natürlich!	yes of course!	
Muufel	Handvoll	handful	lit. a mouthful
Schinnooz	Abdecker	knacker	mainly used as an insult towards women
Flabbes, Stickel/Schdickel	Tollpatsch	klutz, butterfingers	
Schlambambes/Schalumbes/Schnorkes	flatterhafter Mensch	volatile person	
Hannickel	Arbeiter im Ruhrgebiet	worker in the Ruhr area	a combination of the common names Johann & Nikolaus—alternatives include Hampit from Johannes & Peter, or Hannappel from Johannes & Paul an alternative meaning is an awkward (ungewandt) person
Knubbespaller	Holzklotzspalter	log splitter	deriding term for Gastarbeiters who worked in Saarland as log splitters
eepsch	ungeschickt, or falsch	clumsy, or wrong	
meggalisch	außergewöhnlich	incredibly, unbelievably	the strongest intensifying adverb in the dialect

== Other influences ==
Because of its proximity to France, the Hunsrückisch dialect spoken in the Hunsrück region has experienced unique influences from the neighbouring French through the centuries. During Napoleonic times, the Hunsrück region was briefly incorporated into France.

Hunsrückisch	French	Standard German	English
schenniere	gêner	sich genieren	to be embarrassed
allee	allez!	vorwärts, los!	off we go!
loo	là	hier, da	here, there
Troddewa	trottoir	Bürgersteig	pavement/sidewalk
Parbel	parapluie	Regenschirm	umbrella
Baggasch	bagage	Gepäck	baggage/luggage
Schisselong	chaiselongue	Sitz- und Liegemöbel	chaise longue
Schutt	chute	kräftiger Schauer	heavy shower (of rain)
