= Wolken =

- Municipality
- Coat of arms

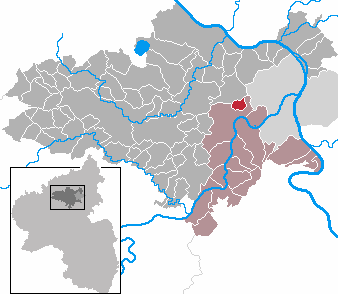
- Location of Wolken within Mayen-Koblenz district
- Interactive map of Wolken
- Location within Germany Location within Rhineland-Palatinate
- Coordinates: 50°20′17″N 7°28′10″E
- Country: Germany
- State: Rhineland-Palatinate
- District: Mayen-Koblenz
- Municipal assoc.: Rhein-Mosel

Government
  - Mayor (2019–24): Walter Hain (CDU)

Area
  - Total: 2.86 km^{2} (1.10 sq mi)
- Elevation: 240 m (790 ft)

Population (2025-12-31)
  - Total: 1,132
  - Density: 396/km^{2} (1,030/sq mi)
- Time zone: UTC+01:00 (CET)
  - Summer (DST): UTC+02:00 (CEST)
- Postal codes: 56332
- Dialling codes: 02607
- Vehicle registration: MYK

Wolken (German pronunciation: [ˈvɔlkn̩]) is a municipality in the district of Mayen-Koblenz in Rhineland-Palatinate, western Germany.
