= Rhens =

- Town
- Coat of arms

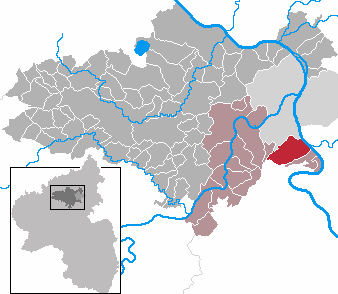
- Location of Rhens within Mayen-Koblenz district
- Interactive map of Rhens
- Location within Germany Location within Rhineland-Palatinate
- Coordinates: 50°16′49.76″N 7°37′5.2″E
- Country: Germany
- State: Rhineland-Palatinate
- District: Mayen-Koblenz
- Municipal assoc.: Rhein-Mosel

Government
  - Mayor (2019–24): Reimund Bogler (CDU)

Area
  - Total: 16.31 km^{2} (6.30 sq mi)
- Elevation: 65 m (213 ft)

Population (2025-12-31)
  - Total: 2,928
  - Density: 179.5/km^{2} (465.0/sq mi)
- Time zone: UTC+01:00 (CET)
  - Summer (DST): UTC+02:00 (CEST)
- Postal codes: 56321
- Dialling codes: 02628
- Vehicle registration: MYK
- Website: www.rhens.de

Rhens (German pronunciation: [ˈʁeːns]) is a municipality in the district Mayen-Koblenz, in Rhineland-Palatinate, Germany. It is situated on the left bank of the Rhine, approx. 10 km south of Koblenz.

Rhens was the seat of the former Verbandsgemeinde ("collective municipality") Rhens, which merged into Rhein-Mosel in 2014.

Charles IV, Holy Roman Emperor was elected here in 1346 as King of the Romans. Also, Rupert of the Palatinate was elected here in 1400 as the King of the Romans.

== Twinnings ==
- Bramley, United Kingdom.

== See also ==
- Declaration of Rhense
