= Winningen =

- Municipality
- Coat of arms

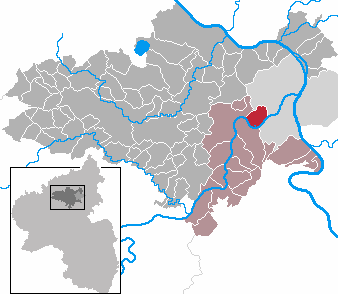
- Location of Winningen within Mayen-Koblenz district
- Interactive map of Winningen
- Location within Germany Location within Rhineland-Palatinate
- Coordinates: 50°18′46″N 7°31′17″E
- Country: Germany
- State: Rhineland-Palatinate
- District: Mayen-Koblenz
- Municipal assoc.: Rhein-Mosel

Government
  - Mayor (2019–24): Rüdiger Weyh (FDP)

Area
  - Total: 6.65 km^{2} (2.57 sq mi)
- Elevation: 79 m (259 ft)

Population (2025-12-31)
  - Total: 2,371
  - Density: 357/km^{2} (923/sq mi)
- Time zone: UTC+01:00 (CET)
  - Summer (DST): UTC+02:00 (CEST)
- Postal codes: 56333
- Dialling codes: 02606
- Vehicle registration: MYK
- Website: www.winningen.de

Winningen (German pronunciation: [ˈvɪnɪŋən]) is a municipality in the district of Mayen-Koblenz in Rhineland-Palatinate, western Germany.

== People ==
- August Horch (1868-1951), German automobile pioneer and industrialist
- Horst Schulze (1929-), German founder of The Ritz Carlton Hotel Company, and the Capella Hotel Group
