= Waldesch =

- Municipality
- Coat of arms

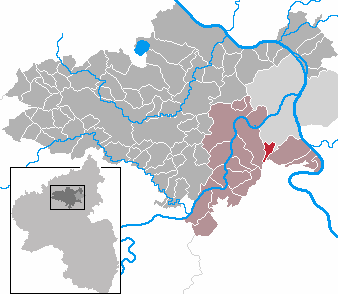
- Location of Waldesch within Mayen-Koblenz district
- Interactive map of Waldesch
- Location within Germany Location within Rhineland-Palatinate
- Coordinates: 50°16′57″N 7°32′42″E
- Country: Germany
- State: Rhineland-Palatinate
- District: Mayen-Koblenz
- Municipal assoc.: Rhein-Mosel

Government
  - Mayor (2019–24): Karlheinz Schmalz

Area
  - Total: 3.34 km^{2} (1.29 sq mi)
- Elevation: 297 m (974 ft)

Population (2025-12-31)
  - Total: 2,266
  - Density: 678/km^{2} (1,760/sq mi)
- Time zone: UTC+01:00 (CET)
  - Summer (DST): UTC+02:00 (CEST)
- Postal codes: 56323
- Dialling codes: 02628
- Vehicle registration: MYK
- Website: www.waldesch.de

Waldesch is a municipality in the district of Mayen-Koblenz in Rhineland-Palatinate, western Germany.
