= Antônio Carlos, Santa Catarina =

Coordinates: 27°31′01″S 48°46′04″W

Antônio Carlos
- Municipality
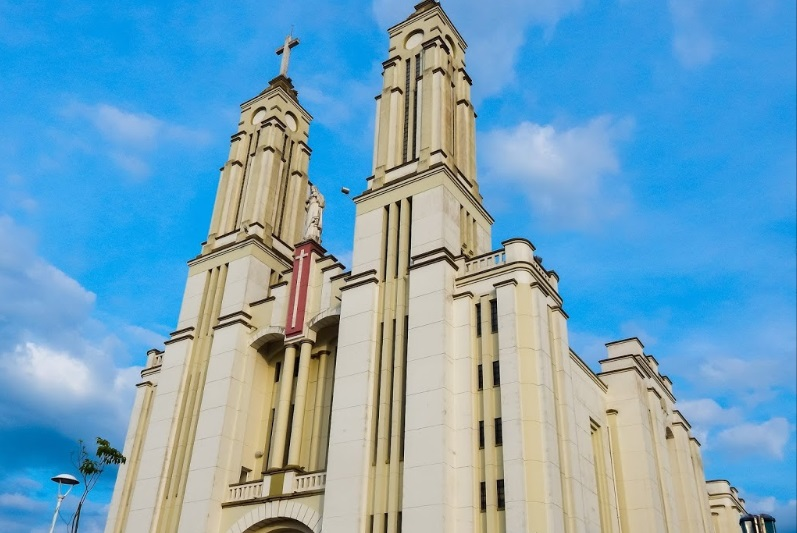

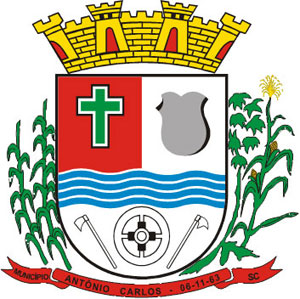
- Flag Coat of arms

- Country: Brazil
- Region: South
- State: Santa Catarina
- Mesoregion: Grande Florianópolis

Government
  - Mayor: Antonio Paulo Remor

Area
  - Total: 228.650 km^{2} (88.282 sq mi)

Population (2010)
  - Total: 7,458
- Time zone: UTC−3 (BRT)

Antônio Carlos is a municipality in the state of Santa Catarina in the South region of Brazil.

== Regional language ==
A local variety of the Hunsrückisch dialect (see: West Germanic languages) has been spoken and is part of the history of this region since pioneer days starting almost two centuries ago. Hunsrückisch is a co-official language of this municipality. Elsewhere, mostly in the western part of Santa Catarina state, but especially in the neighboring state of Rio Grande do Sul, the predominant German dialect is the Riograndenser Hunsrückisch variety of the same language group. (See also: Pennsylvania German language, a mutually intelligible variety of German spoken in the United States and Canada).

== See also ==
- List of municipalities in Santa Catarina
