= Widdehagen =

Mountain in Hesse, Germany

Coordinates: 51°18′N 8°46′E

Highest point
- Elevation: 634.7 m (2,082 ft)

Geography
- Location: Landkreis Waldeck-Frankenberg, Hesse, Germany

Widdehagen is a mountain of Landkreis Waldeck-Frankenberg, Hesse, Germany.
