= Niederfell =

- Municipality
- Coat of arms

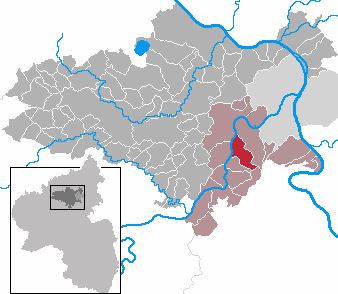
- Location of Niederfell within Mayen-Koblenz district
- Interactive map of Niederfell
- Location within Germany Location within Rhineland-Palatinate
- Coordinates: 50°17′25″N 7°27′45″E
- Country: Germany
- State: Rhineland-Palatinate
- District: Mayen-Koblenz
- Municipal assoc.: Rhein-Mosel

Government
  - Mayor (2019–24): Arnold Herrmann

Area
  - Total: 11.67 km^{2} (4.51 sq mi)
- Elevation: 70–210 m (230–690 ft)

Population (2025-12-31)
  - Total: 971
  - Density: 83.2/km^{2} (215/sq mi)
- Time zone: UTC+01:00 (CET)
  - Summer (DST): UTC+02:00 (CEST)
- Postal codes: 56332
- Dialling codes: 02607
- Vehicle registration: MYK
- Website: www.niederfell.de

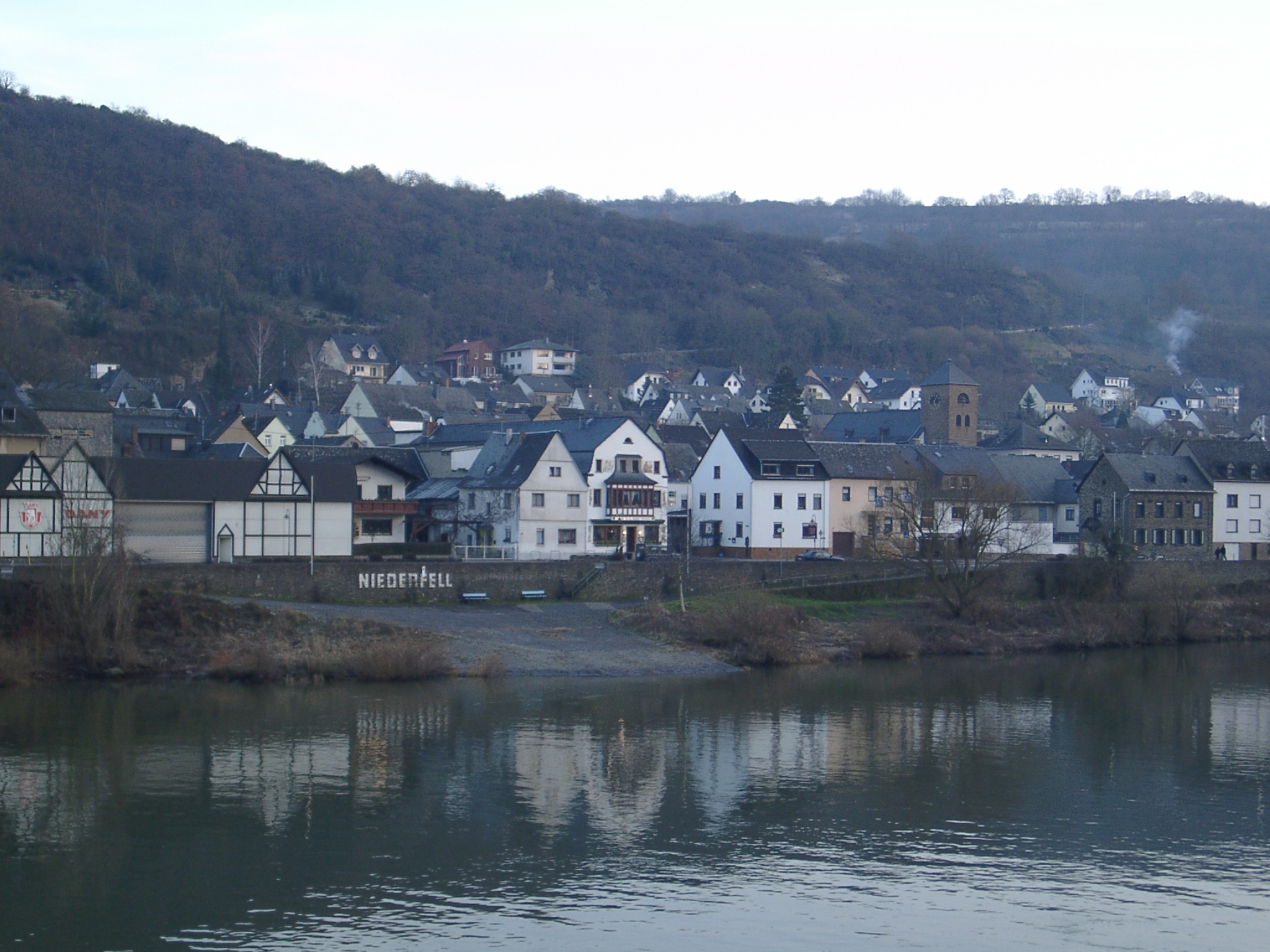
Photo of the town in 2005

Niederfell is a small town located in the municipal association of Rhein-Mosel, which is within the rural district of Mayen-Koblenz, in the German state of Rhineland-Palatinate, near the country's western border. It is located across the Mosel River from the small town of Gondorf, about 17 kilometres (11 mi) from the city of Koblenz.

This town has existed for over a thousand years. A document that was prepared under the Archbishop Poppo describes donations to the Abbey of Saint Mary in the year 1030 A.D., and Niederfell is mentioned in that document (the Abbey of St. Mary was located at what is now called the Exzellenzhaus in Trier). That document also refers to an older document of Archbishop Egbertus from the year 980 A.D., and accordingly Niederfell celebrated its 1000th anniversary in 1980.

In the early 1600s, during the Thirty Years War, this town was repeatedly destroyed, and therefore no medieval buildings still exist there. The town's population has been fairly stable since 1950, at about one thousand people.
