= Burgen, Mayen-Koblenz =

Burgen
- Municipality
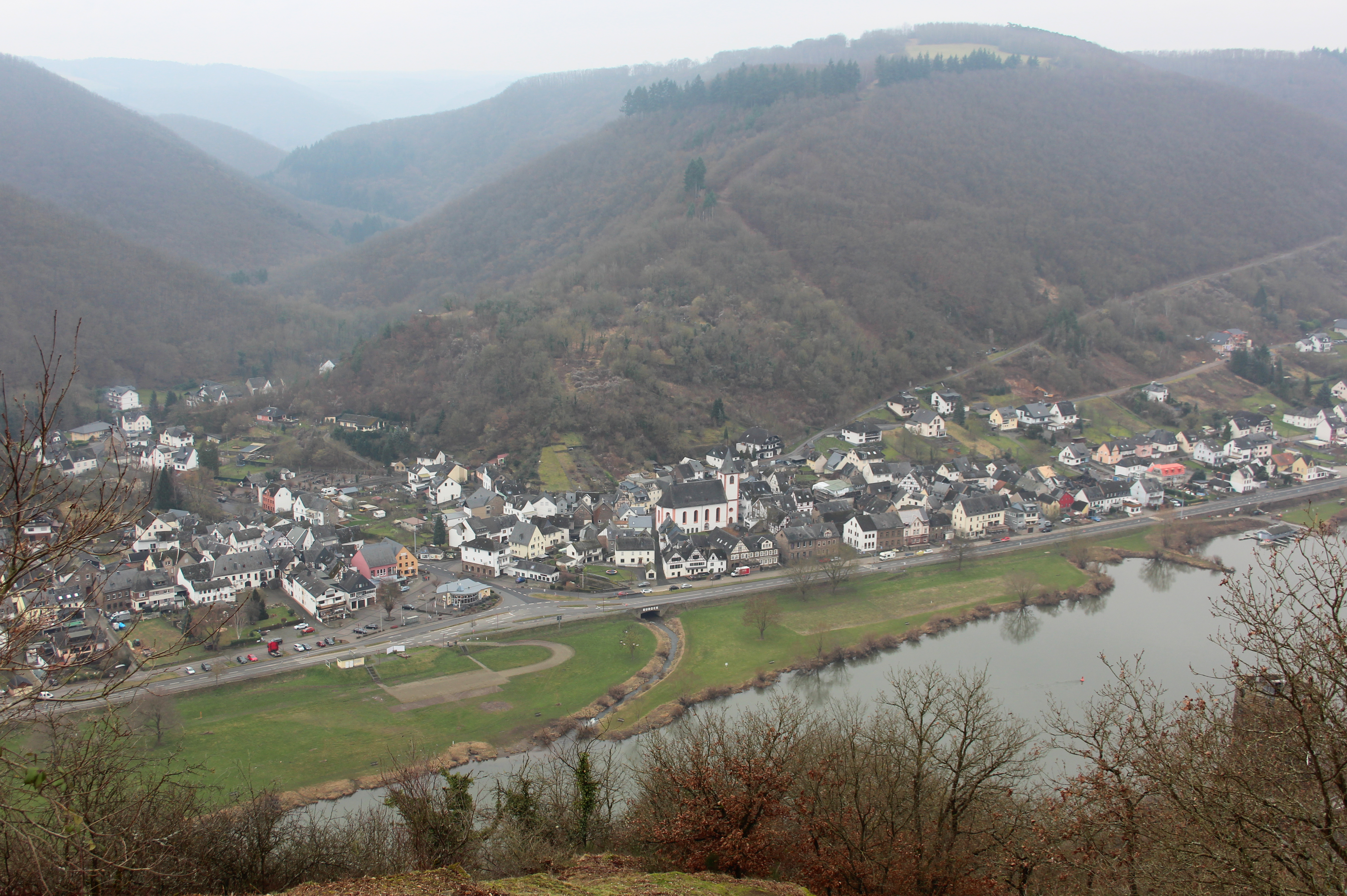

- Coat of arms

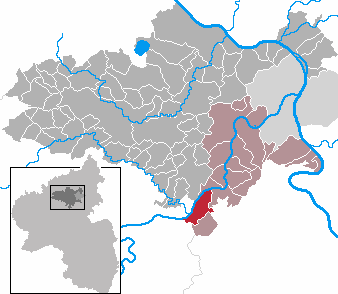
- Location of Burgen within Mayen-Koblenz district
- Interactive map of Burgen
- Location within Germany Location within Rhineland-Palatinate
- Coordinates: 50°12′44″N 7°23′24″E
- Country: Germany
- State: Rhineland-Palatinate
- District: Mayen-Koblenz
- Municipal assoc.: Rhein-Mosel

Government
  - Mayor (2019–24): Fritz Martin Bär

Area
  - Total: 11.27 km^{2} (4.35 sq mi)
- Elevation: 90 m (300 ft)

Population (2025-12-31)
  - Total: 762
  - Density: 67.6/km^{2} (175/sq mi)
- Time zone: UTC+01:00 (CET)
  - Summer (DST): UTC+02:00 (CEST)
- Postal codes: 56332
- Dialling codes: 02605
- Vehicle registration: MYK
- Website: burgen-untermosel.de

Burgen (German pronunciation: [ˈbʊʁɡn̩]) is a municipality in the district of Mayen-Koblenz in Rhineland-Palatinate, western Germany.
