= Macken, Germany =

Macken
- Municipality
- Coat of arms

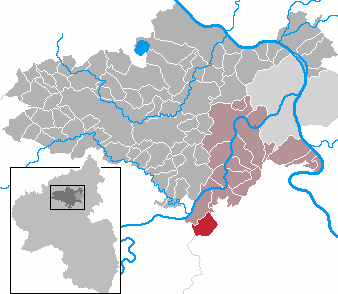
- Location of Macken within Mayen-Koblenz district
- Interactive map of Macken
- Location within Germany Location within Rhineland-Palatinate
- Coordinates: 50°10′27″N 7°23′50″E
- Country: Germany
- State: Rhineland-Palatinate
- District: Mayen-Koblenz
- Municipal assoc.: Rhein-Mosel

Government
  - Mayor (2019–24): Marco Kneip

Area
  - Total: 8.61 km^{2} (3.32 sq mi)
- Elevation: 320 m (1,050 ft)

Population (2025-12-31)
  - Total: 385
  - Density: 44.7/km^{2} (116/sq mi)
- Time zone: UTC+01:00 (CET)
  - Summer (DST): UTC+02:00 (CEST)
- Postal codes: 56290
- Dialling codes: 02605
- Vehicle registration: MYK
- Website: www.macken.de

Macken (German pronunciation: [ˈmakn̩]) is a municipality in the district of Mayen-Koblenz in Rhineland-Palatinate, western Germany.
