= Hatzenport =

- Municipality
- Coat of arms

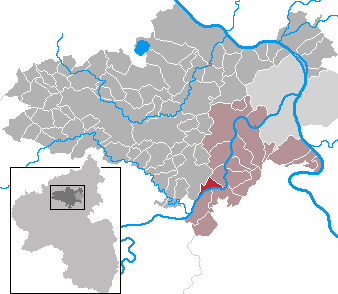
- Location of Hatzenport within Mayen-Koblenz district
- Interactive map of Hatzenport
- Location within Germany Location within Rhineland-Palatinate
- Coordinates: 50°13′41″N 7°25′16″E
- Country: Germany
- State: Rhineland-Palatinate
- District: Mayen-Koblenz
- Municipal assoc.: Rhein-Mosel

Government
  - Mayor (2024–now): Christian Müller.

Area
  - Total: 3.75 km^{2} (1.45 sq mi)
- Elevation: 85 m (279 ft)

Population (2025-12-31)
  - Total: 582
  - Density: 155/km^{2} (402/sq mi)
- Time zone: UTC+01:00 (CET)
  - Summer (DST): UTC+02:00 (CEST)
- Postal codes: 56332
- Dialling codes: 02605
- Vehicle registration: MYK
- Website: www.hatzenport.de

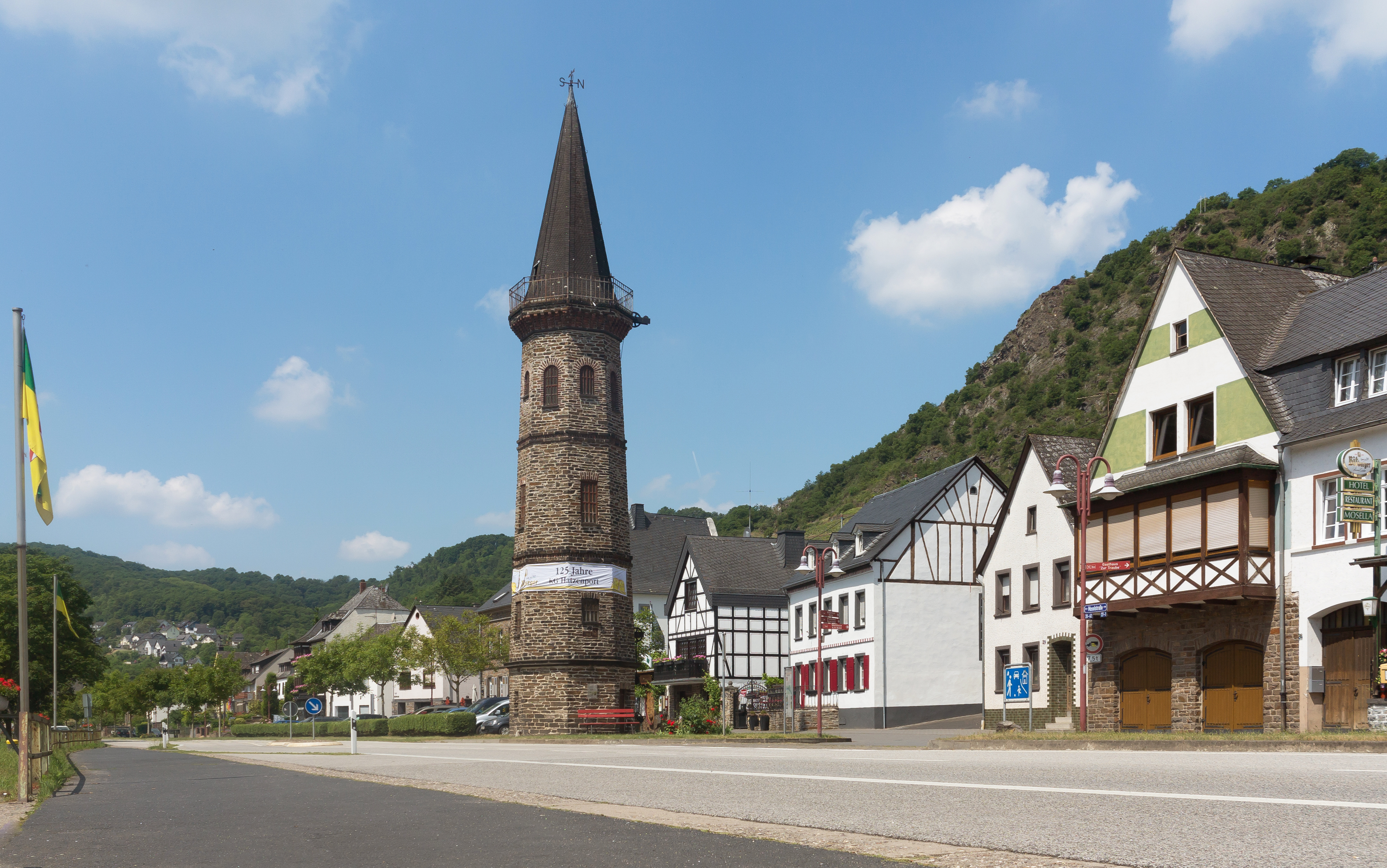
Hatzenport, the ferry tower

Hatzenport (German pronunciation: [ˈhatsn̩pɔʁt]) is a municipality in the district of Mayen-Koblenz in Rhineland-Palatinate, western Germany.
