= Alken, Germany =

Alken
- Municipality
- Coat of arms

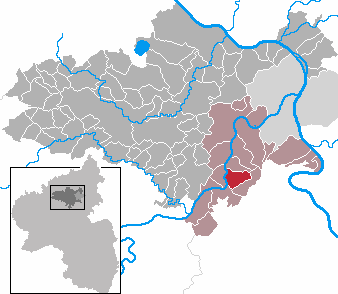
- Location of Alken within Mayen-Koblenz district
- Interactive map of Alken
- Location within Germany Location within Rhineland-Palatinate
- Coordinates: 50°14′54″N 7°27′00″E
- Country: Germany
- State: Rhineland-Palatinate
- District: Mayen-Koblenz
- Municipal assoc.: Rhein-Mosel

Government
  - Mayor (2019–24): Hans-Walter Escher

Area
  - Total: 8.06 km^{2} (3.11 sq mi)
- Elevation: 80 m (260 ft)

Population (2025-12-31)
  - Total: 697
  - Density: 86.5/km^{2} (224/sq mi)
- Time zone: UTC+01:00 (CET)
  - Summer (DST): UTC+02:00 (CEST)
- Postal codes: 56332
- Dialling codes: 02605
- Vehicle registration: MYK
- Website: www.alken.de

Alken (German pronunciation: [ˈalkn̩]) is a municipality in the district of Mayen-Koblenz in Rhineland-Palatinate, western Germany.

Above the village on a hill spur stand the ruins of Thurant Castle.
