= Nörtershausen =

- Municipality
- Coat of arms

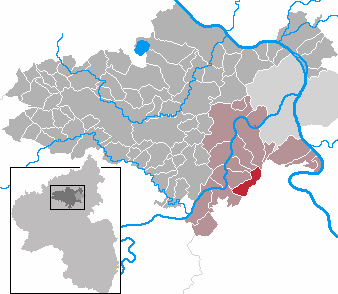
- Location of Nörtershausen within Mayen-Koblenz district
- Interactive map of Nörtershausen
- Location within Germany Location within Rhineland-Palatinate
- Coordinates: 50°13′31″N 7°28′53″E
- Country: Germany
- State: Rhineland-Palatinate
- District: Mayen-Koblenz
- Municipal assoc.: Rhein-Mosel
- Subdivisions: 2

Government
  - Mayor (2019–24): Paul Kreber

Area
  - Total: 5.66 km^{2} (2.19 sq mi)
- Elevation: 365 m (1,198 ft)

Population (2025-12-31)
  - Total: 1,148
  - Density: 203/km^{2} (525/sq mi)
- Time zone: UTC+01:00 (CET)
  - Summer (DST): UTC+02:00 (CEST)
- Postal codes: 56283
- Dialling codes: 02605
- Vehicle registration: MYK
- Website: www.noertershausen.de

Nörtershausen (German pronunciation: [nœʁtɐsˈhaʊzn̩]) is a municipality in the district of Mayen-Koblenz in Rhineland-Palatinate, western Germany.
