= Löf =

- Municipality
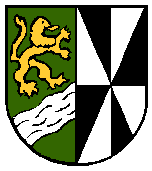
- Coat of arms

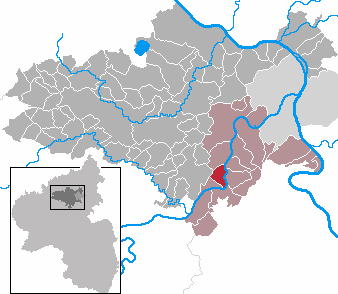
- Location of Löf within Mayen-Koblenz district
- Interactive map of Löf
- Location within Germany Location within Rhineland-Palatinate
- Coordinates: 50°14′02″N 7°26′43″E
- Country: Germany
- State: Rhineland-Palatinate
- District: Mayen-Koblenz
- Municipal assoc.: Rhein-Mosel
- Subdivisions: 2

Government
  - Mayor (2019–24): Johannes Liesenfeld (CDU)

Area
  - Total: 5.34 km^{2} (2.06 sq mi)
- Elevation: 85 m (279 ft)

Population (2025-12-31)
  - Total: 1,483
  - Density: 278/km^{2} (719/sq mi)
- Time zone: UTC+01:00 (CET)
  - Summer (DST): UTC+02:00 (CEST)
- Postal codes: 56332
- Dialling codes: 02605
- Vehicle registration: MYK
- Website: www.loef-mosel.de

Löf is a municipality in the district of Mayen-Koblenz in Rhineland-Palatinate, western Germany.
