= The Descent from the Cross (Rubens, 1600–1602) =

Painting by Peter Paul Rubens

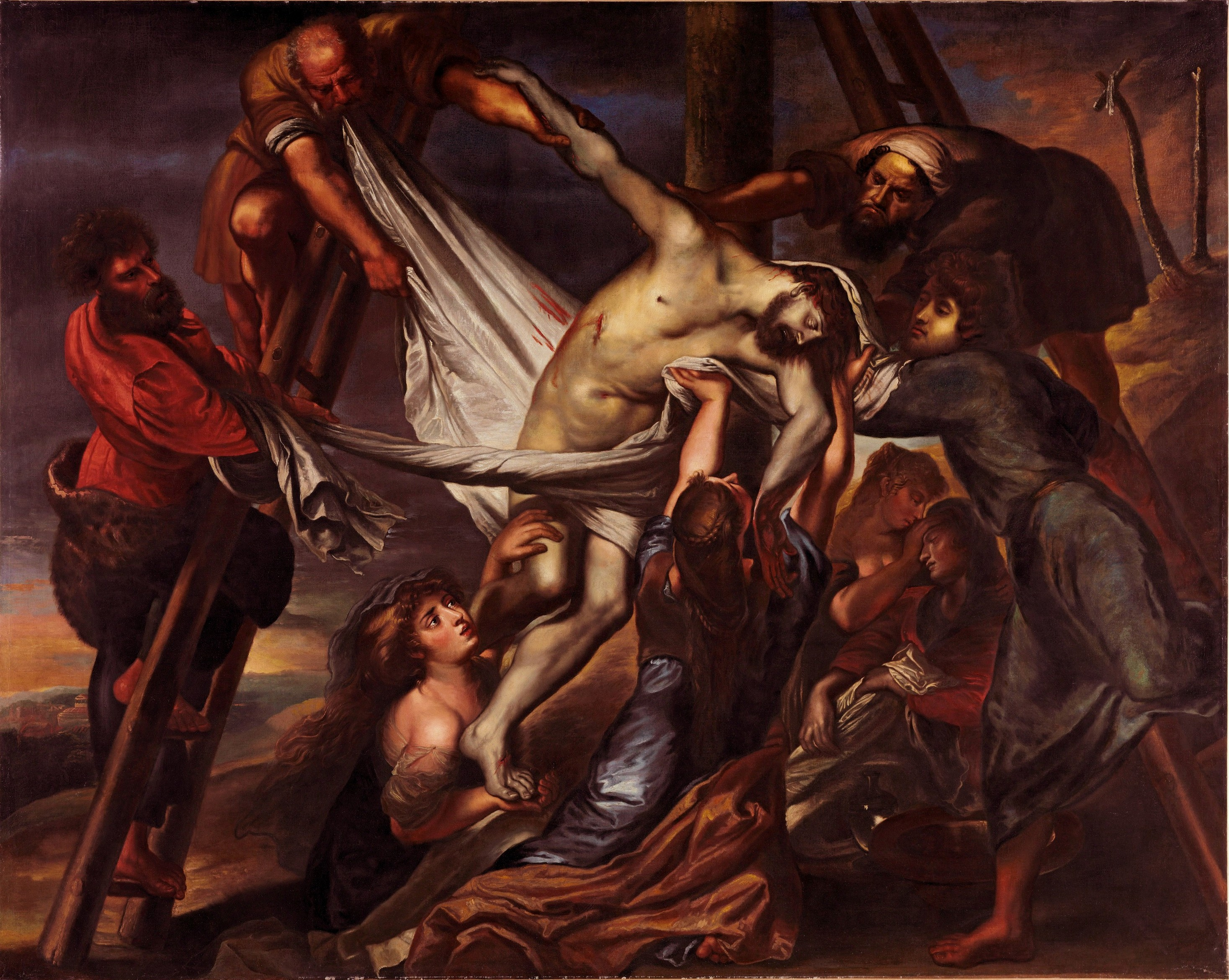
Sir Peter Paul Rubens, The Descent from the Cross (1600–1602), 203 × 257 cm, Siegerland-Museum, Siegen, Oberes Schloss

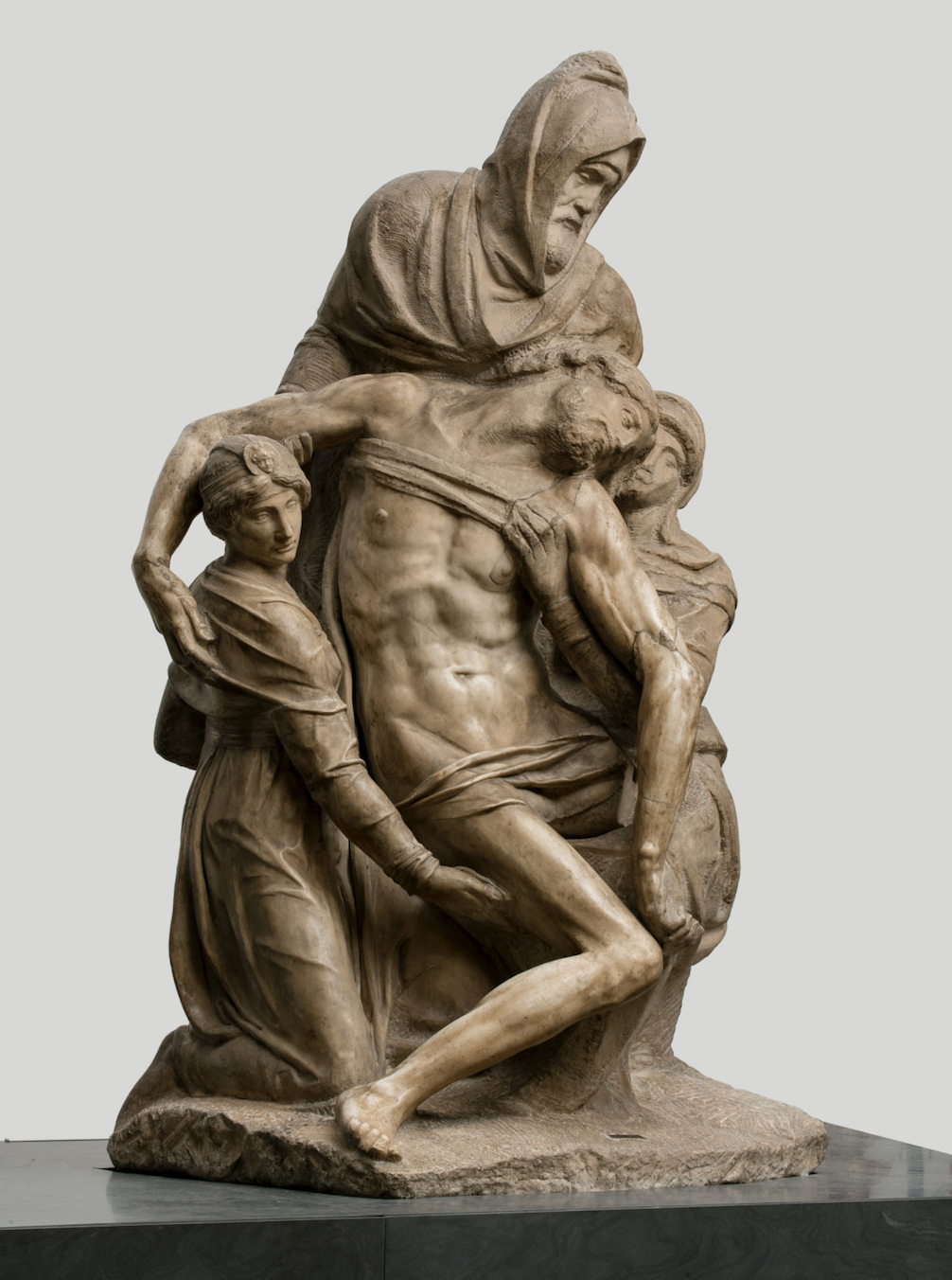
Michelangelo Pieta Bandini, Florence

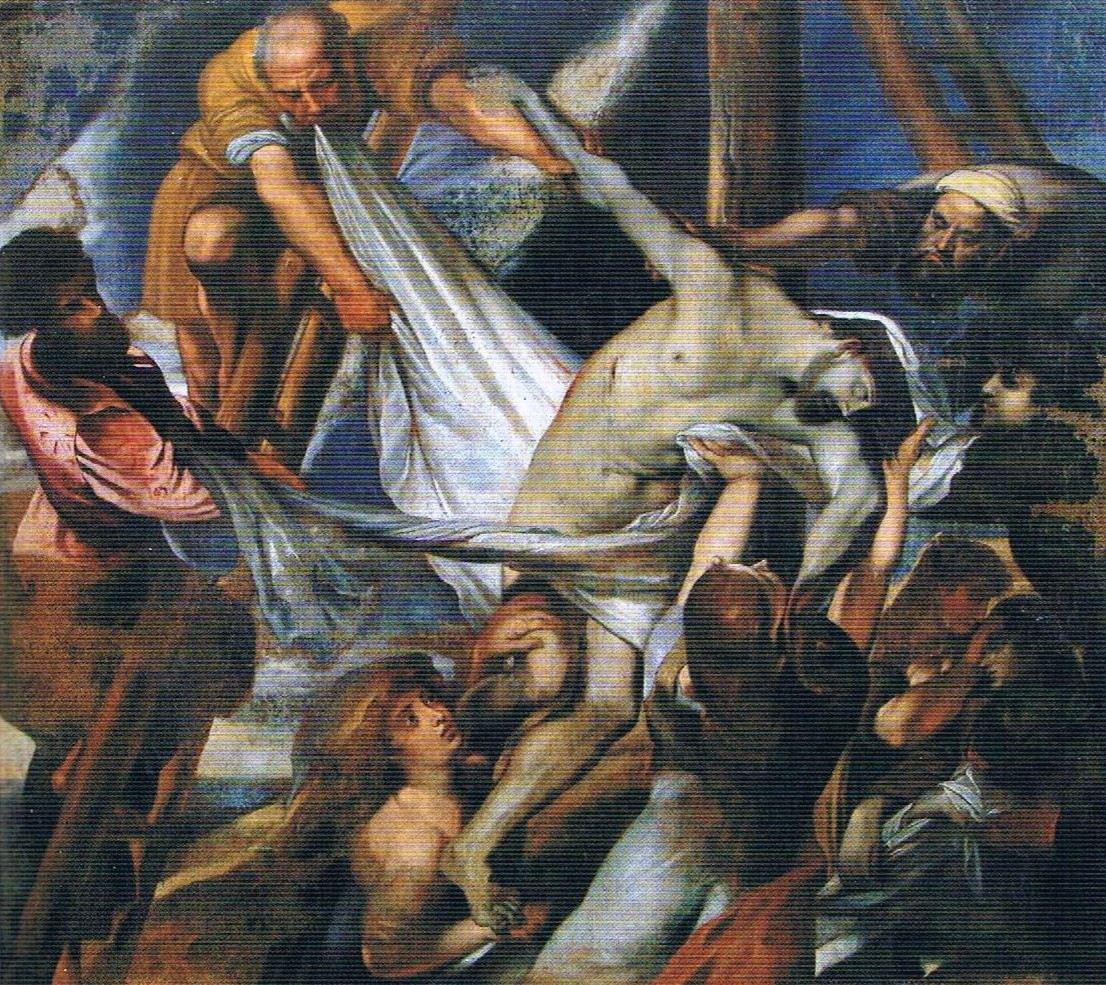
Francesco Marcoleoni, copy of the descent from the cross (1611), 127x143cm (50x56in), cut

Descent from the Cross is an oil-on-canvas painting of 1600–1602 by the Flemish artist Peter Paul Rubens, now in the Siegerlandmuseum in the Oberes Schloss in Siegen. It was his first major commissioned work made for the private chapel of Eleonora de’ Medici Gonzaga (1567–1611), duchess of Mantua. The painting remained somewhat obscure until 2001, when it was discovered by German art historian Justus Müller-Hofstede, a specialist on Rubens' early work.

== Description ==
The large-size altarpiece revolutionizes the usual illustrations of Jesus' Descent from the Cross of the Cinquecento and engrosses the idea of the holy Eucharist: The kneeling lady in the foreground as a symbolic embodiment of the duchess who receives the Body of Christ like a lover for supper (cf. John 6:54–59). Stylistically, the painting is comparable to another early work created approximately at the same time: The Elevation of the Cross for the chapel of the church Santa Croce in Gerusalemme, which offers the same perspective to the mourning group of women.

== History ==
Rubens knew the descent from the cross (pieta bandini) by Michelangelo, which he may have seen in Rome or else knew by an engraving by Cherubino Alberti. Engaged by the duchess of Mantua, Eleonora Gonzaga, Rubens joined a competition (paragone) with the sculptor and created a new composition. Rubens adjusted the commissional work for the duchess Eleonora de’ Medici in Mantua exactly to the dimensions of the reredos. Rubens as the creator of the painting is proven archivally since it was copied by the court painter Francesco Marcoleoni in 1611 (after the duchess' death) for the church Santa Maria Assunta in Susano.

The historic text describes Marcoleoni's copy and Rubens' original reference as follows: [...] Un Christo che togliono di croce, che coppiò messer Francesco Marco Leone che viene da Pietro Paolo Fiamingo, et è originale nella capella di Santa Croce di sopra in Corte [...].

After early drafts (Hermitage Museum, Saint Petersburg), Rubens devoted himself also in later periods to the idea of the Descent from the Cross, among them the famous triptych The Descent from the Cross in Antwerp and works on the subject in Lille, St Petersburg and Arras (1610).

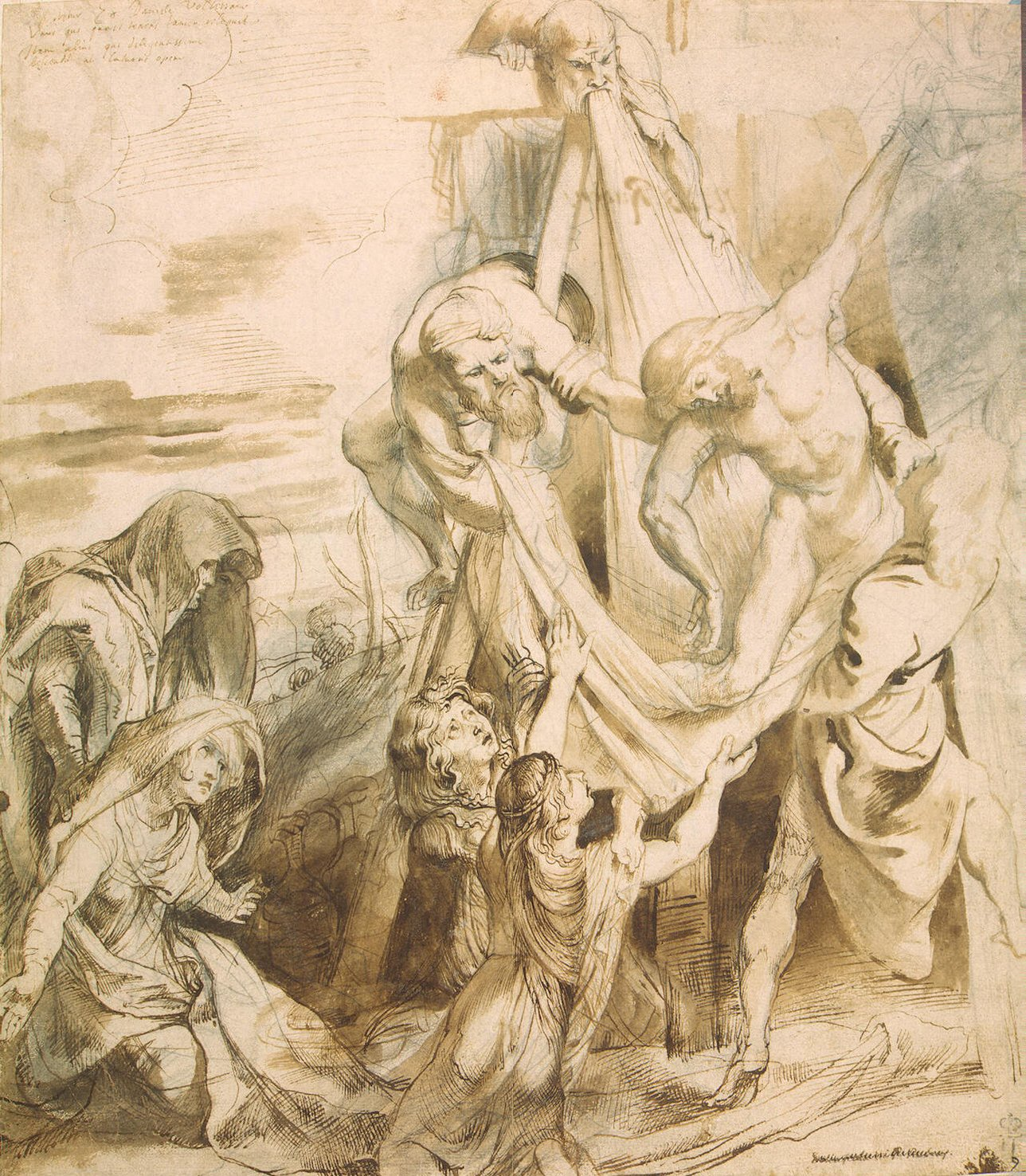
Pencil, ink, and ink wash on paper, St. Petersburg, Hermitage

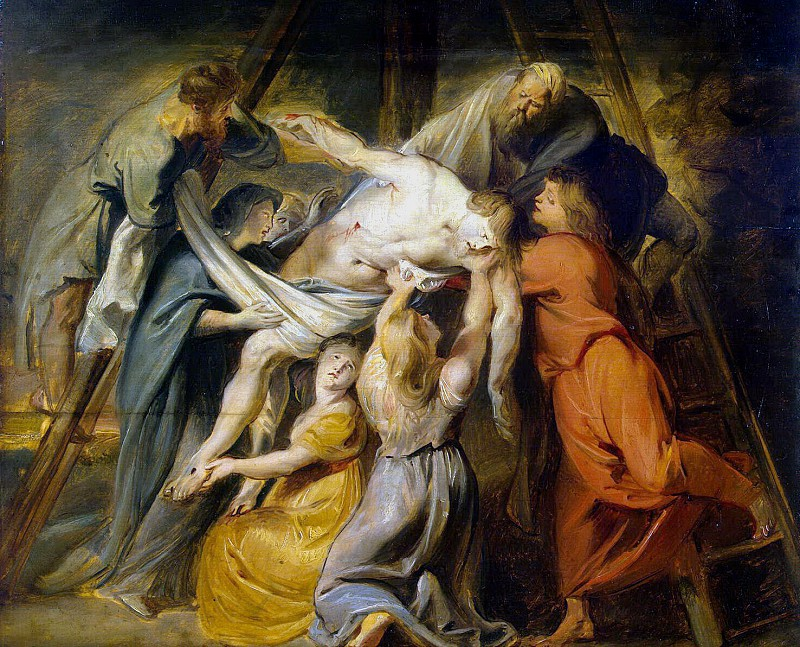
St. Petersburg, Hermitage, (1604-1614)

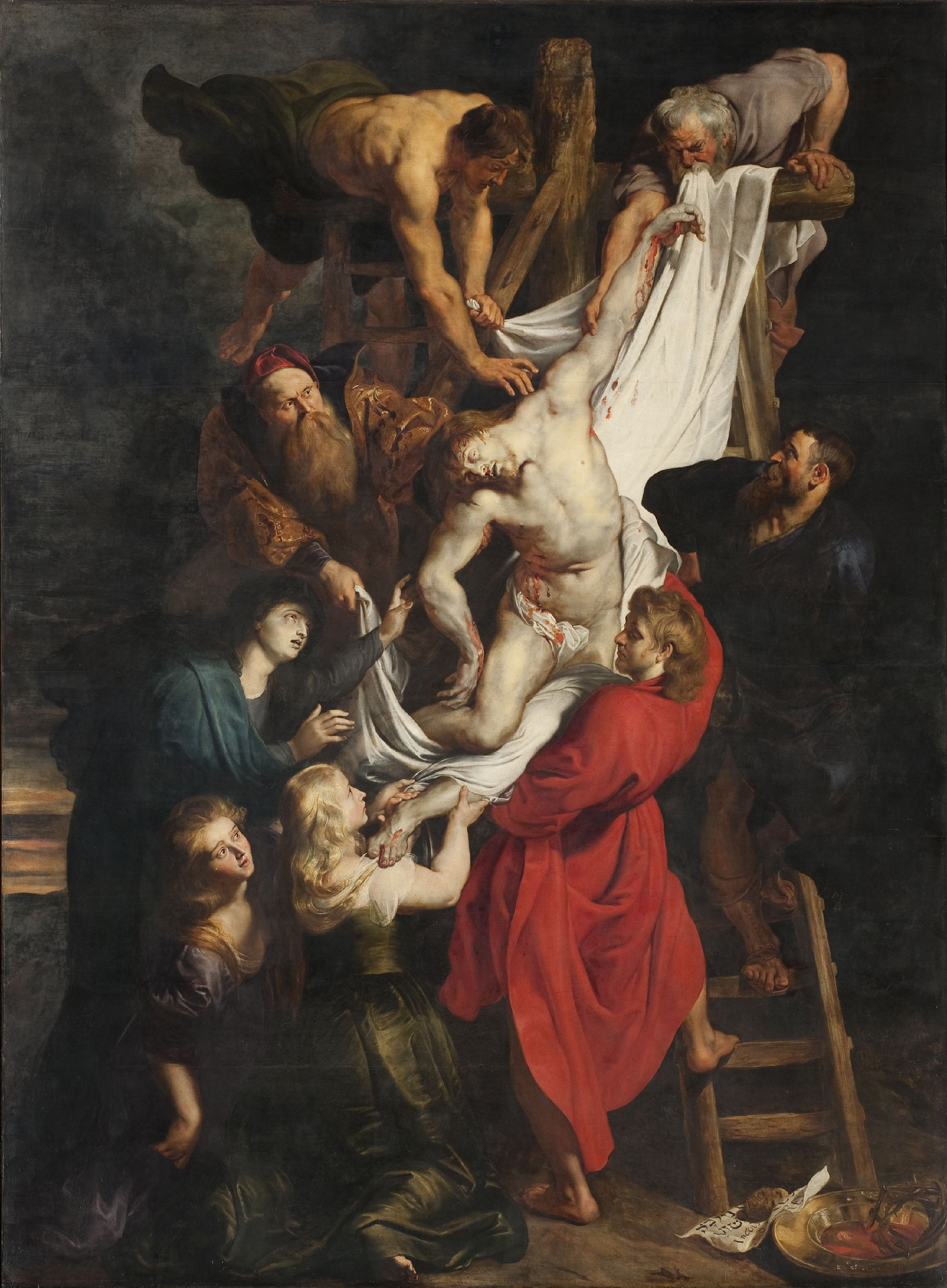
Antwerp, Cathedral of Our Lady (1612)

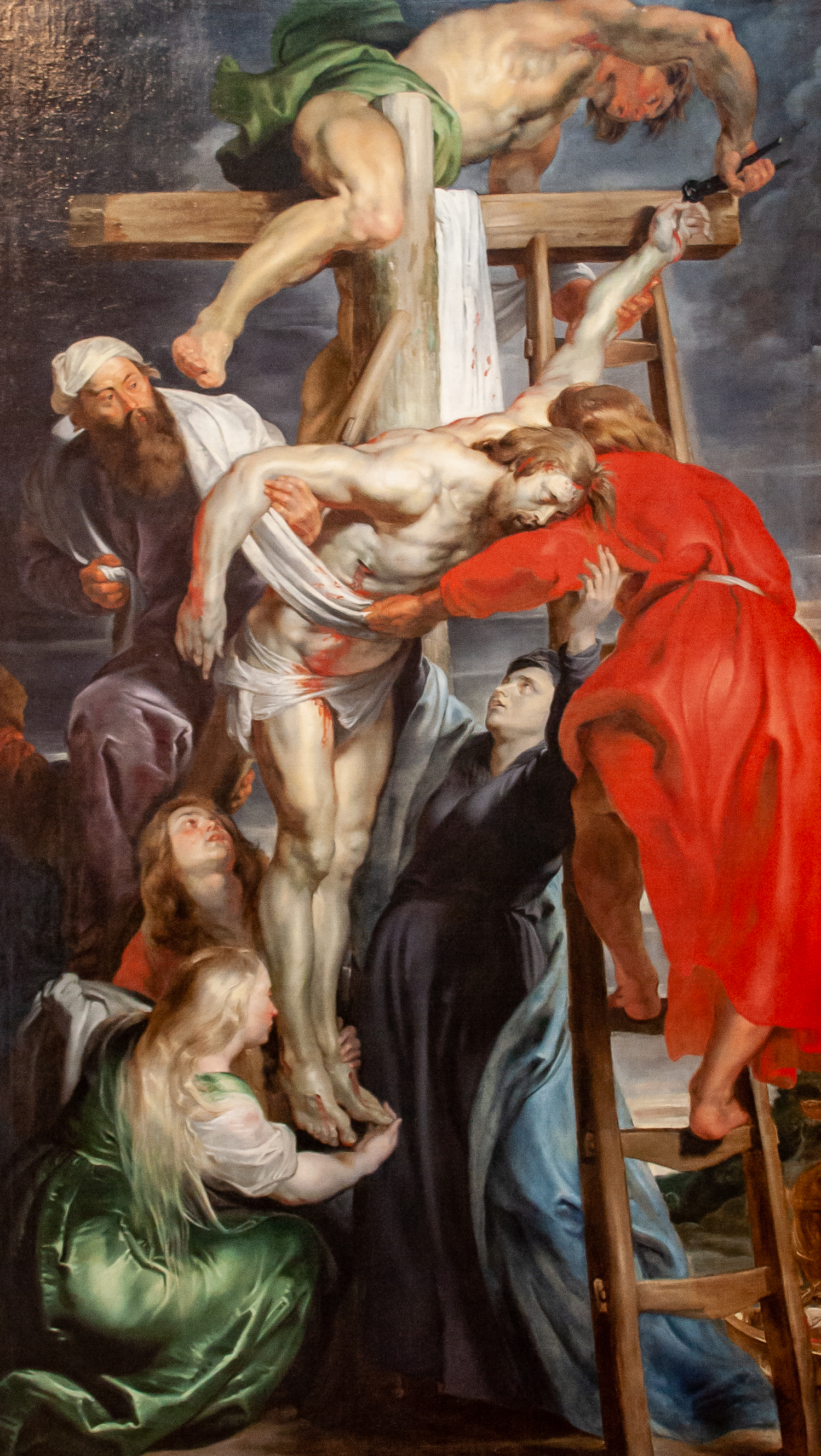
Valenciennes, Museum (1614–1615)

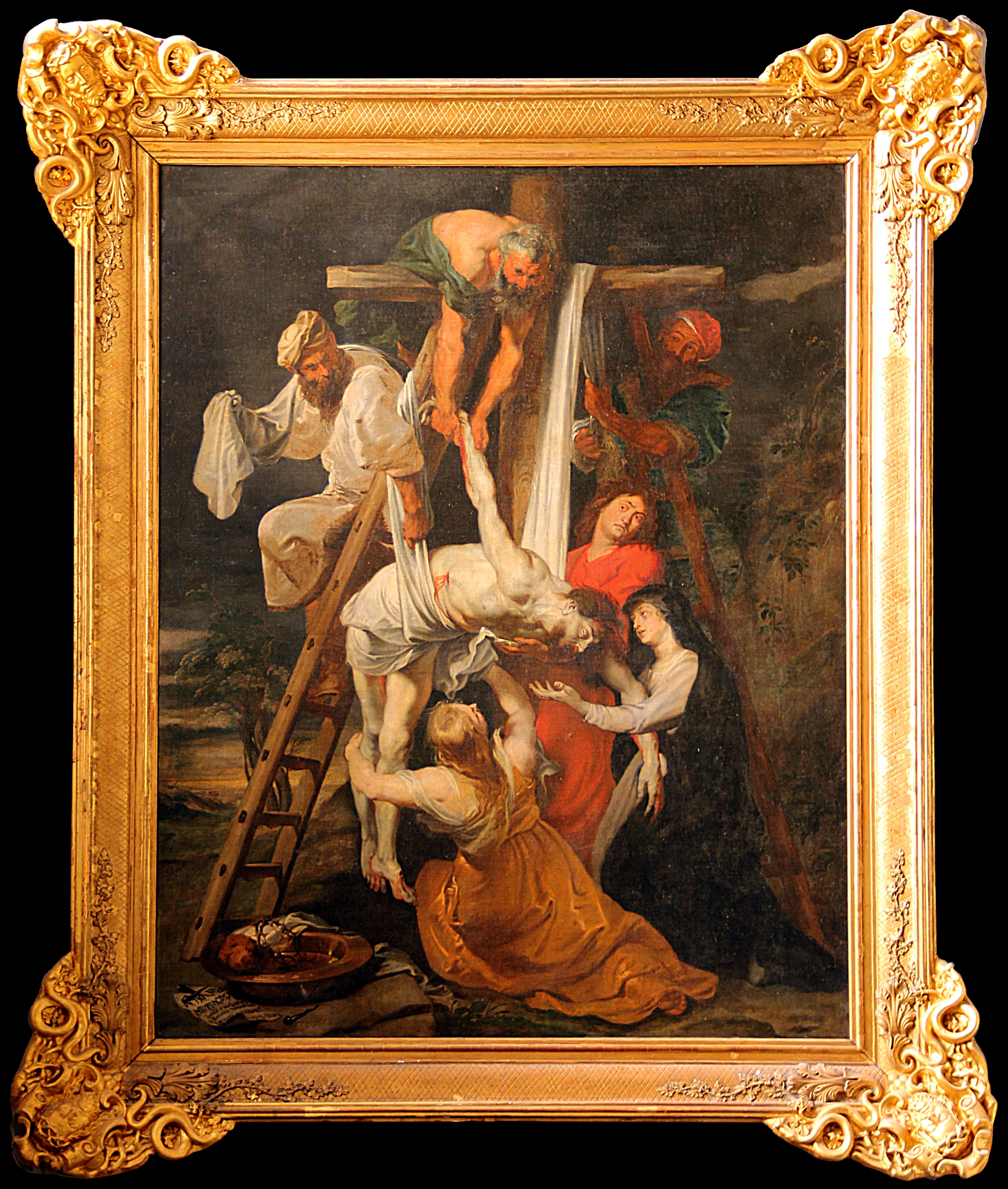
Saint-Omer, Cathedral Notre-Dame (1616)

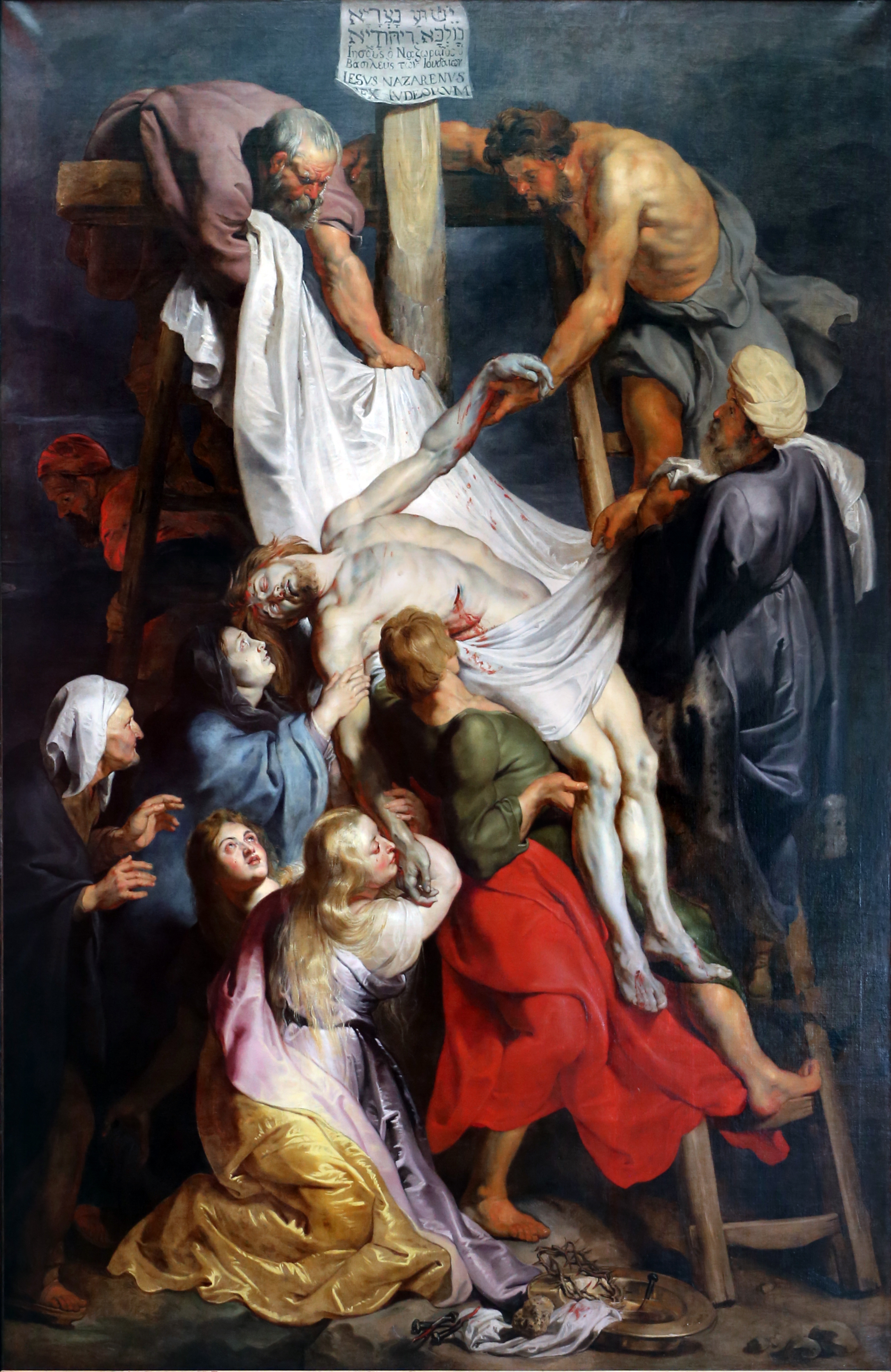
Lille, Museum (1617–1618)

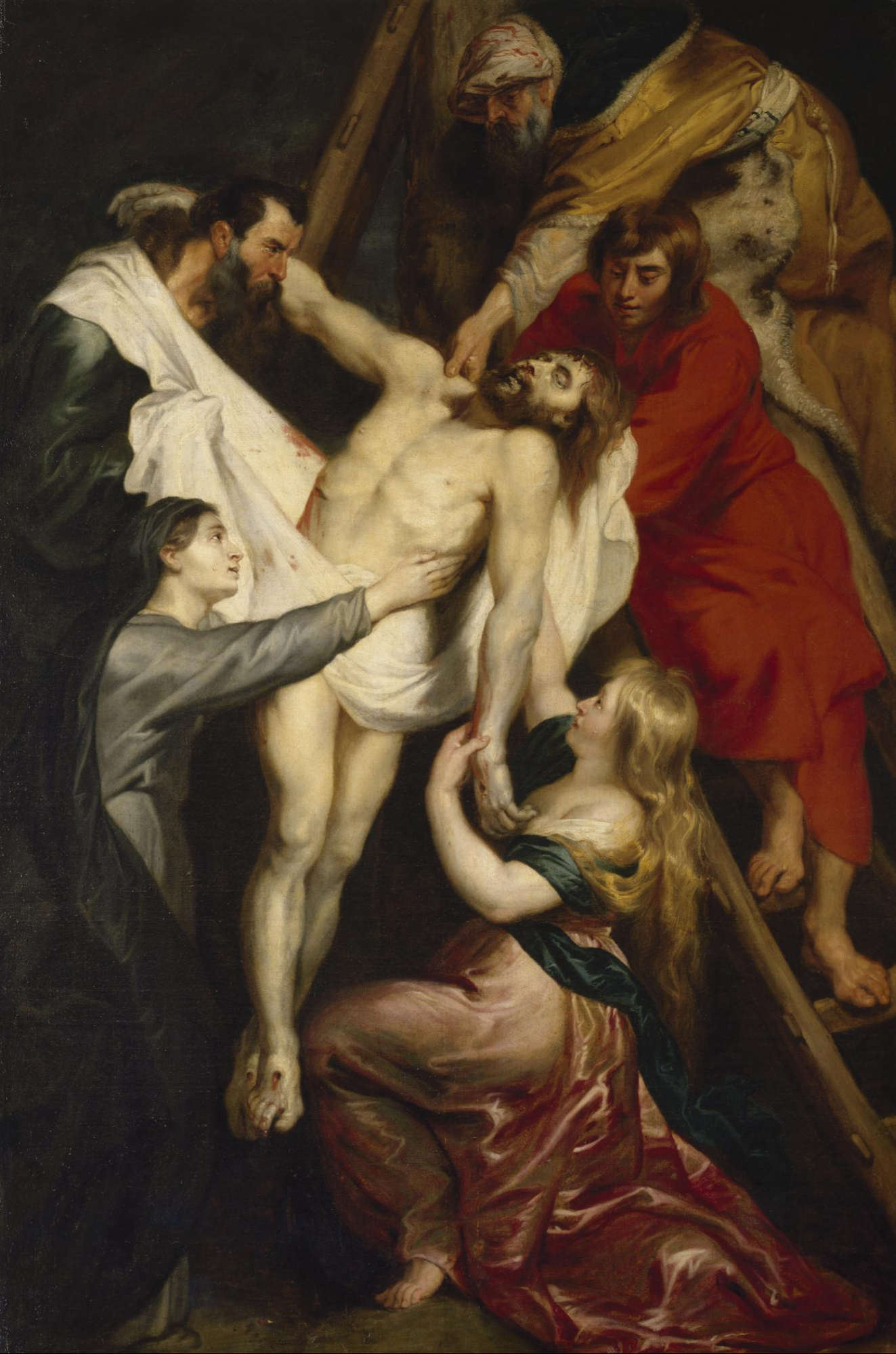
Saint Petersburg, Hermitage Museum (1618)

== See also ==
- The Descent from the Cross (Rubens), for other paintings by Rubens of the same title
