= Arnold Wolff =

German architect (1932–2019)

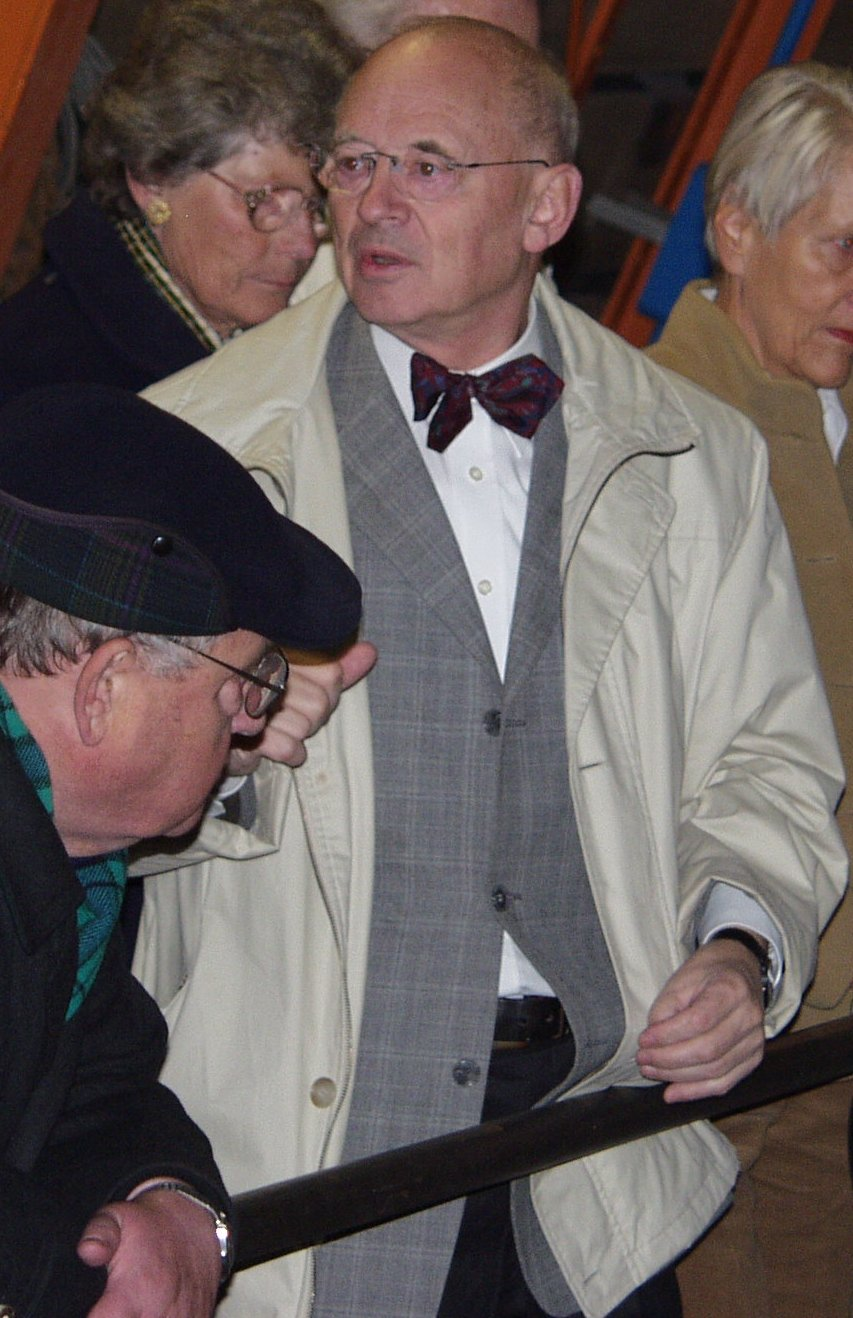
Wolff in the roof truss of Cologne Cathedral on 18 October 2003

Arnold Wolff (26 July 1932 – 24 December 2019) was a German architect. He was Cologne Cathedral Master Builder and head of the Dombauhütte of the Cologne Cathedral from 1972 to 1998. From 1986 to 1997, he was academic teacher for restoration and conservation at the Cologne University of Applied Sciences.

== Life ==
Born in Stadt Wevelinghoven, district of Grevenbroich, Wolff, the son of a teacher couple, grew up with four younger siblings in Kapellen/Erft. Already in his childhood and youth he was interested in historical buildings. He attended the Quirinus-Gymnasium Neuss from 1942 to 1954, initially with interruptions due to the war. After one semester of teacher training at the Pädagogische Akademie in Cologne, Wolff studied architecture at the RWTH Aachen from November 1954, where he graduated in autumn 1961.

At the RWTH, the Cologne master builder Willy Weyres, who had a teaching assignment in Aachen, became aware of the student Wolff. Already in the late 1950s and early 1960s, he was doing work for the Cologne Cathedral (1:1 scale photograph of the Shrine of the Three Kings), before Weyres finally hired him as an architect in the Cologne Cathedral Building Administration in May 1962. In 1968, Wolff received his doctorate from the RWTH with a dissertation on the first construction period of the Gothic cathedral. With this work, he set new standards in the field of medieval architectural archaeology; its essential results are still current today and form the basis of every building history of architectural history of the Cologne Cathedral. In 1972 he succeeded his teacher Weyres in the office of the Cologne Cathedral Master Builder, which he held until the anniversary year 1998. During these years, not only were the cathedral archives reorganised, but also the Dombauhütte Köln was rebuilt and the in-house "Verlag Kölner Dom" was founded. In addition to the immense restoration and conservation work on the cathedral, a new appreciation of the artistic achievement of the 19th century also took place under his leadership. This primarily concerns the reinstatement of the large west window by Carl Julius Milde, which was created in the years from 1865 to 1870 and was expanded but damaged in the Second World War.

In 1986, the state government of North Rhine-Westphalia appointed him professor. He taught at the Cologne University of Applied Sciences in the Department of Restoration and Conservation. Wolff also worked as an author and editor for the scientific research and popularity of Cologne Cathedral.

Wolff was married to Gerta Ramjoue (1935-2018), author of the city and museum guide Das römisch-germanische Köln (1981), which was published several times. They had three daughters and a son.

In 2002, on the occasion of his 70th birthday, the Dombauhütte honoured Wolff by creating a gargoyle on Cologne Cathedral in the shape of a wolf wearing a bow tie and a Wolf Lewis - three allusions to Wolff.

Wolff died in Heiligabend aged 87 and was buried in Cologne's Melaten cemetery on 11 January 2020.

== Awards ==
- 1998: Kölner Kulturpreis.
- 1998: Knight Commander of the Order of St. Gregory the Great.
- 2004: Order of Merit of North Rhine-Westphalia.
- 2012: Honorary membership of the Koldewey-Gesellschaft

== Publications ==
- Chronologie der ersten Bauzeit des Kölner Domes 1248–1277. Dissertation, Kölner Domblatt, vol.. 28/29 (1968) pp. 7–230, DNB-IDN 482426608.
- Der Dom zu Köln. Bearbeitet und ergänzt von Barbara Schock-Werner. Greven, Köln 2015, ISBN 978-3-7743-0658-5.
- Das Chormosaik im Kölner Dom (Meisterwerke des Kölner Domes, Band 11). Verlag Kölner Dom, Cologne 2012, ISBN 978-3-922442-74-5, (also in English: ISBN 978-3-922442-75-2).
- Arnold Wolff (ed.): Sulpiz Boisserée. Der Briefwechsel mit Moller, Schinkel and Zwirner. Verlag Kölner Dom, Greven, Cologne 2008, ISBN 978-3-7743-0405-5.
