= Vincenz Statz =

German architect (1819–1898)

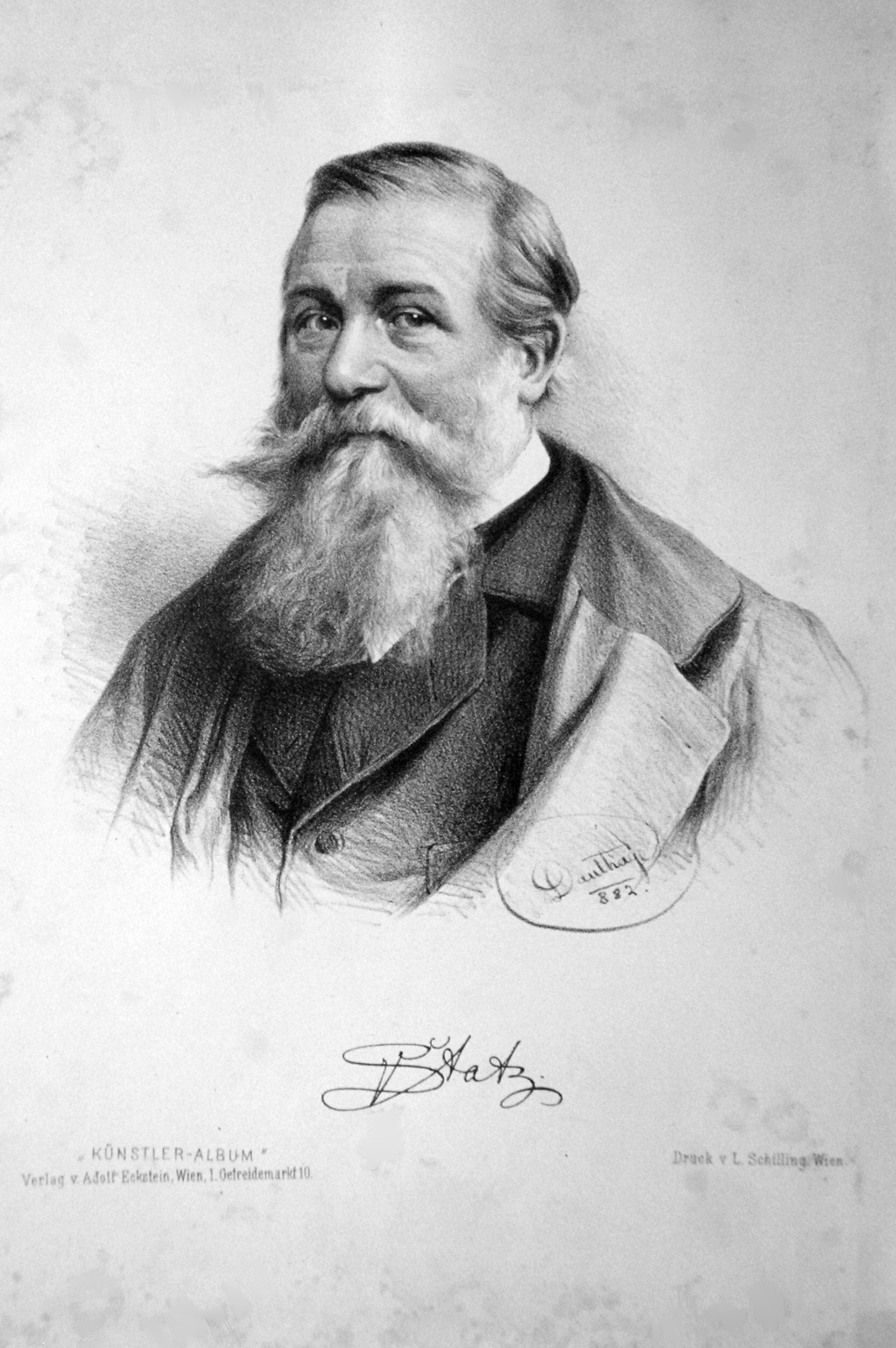
Vincenz Statz, lithograph by Adolf Dauthage, 1882

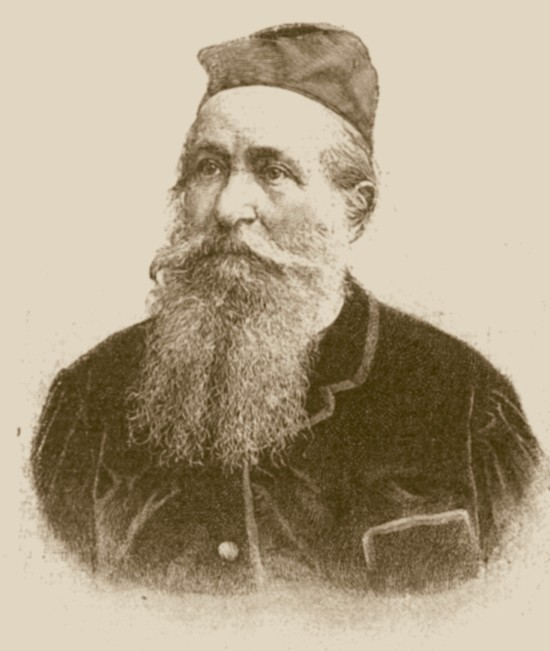
Vincenz Statz

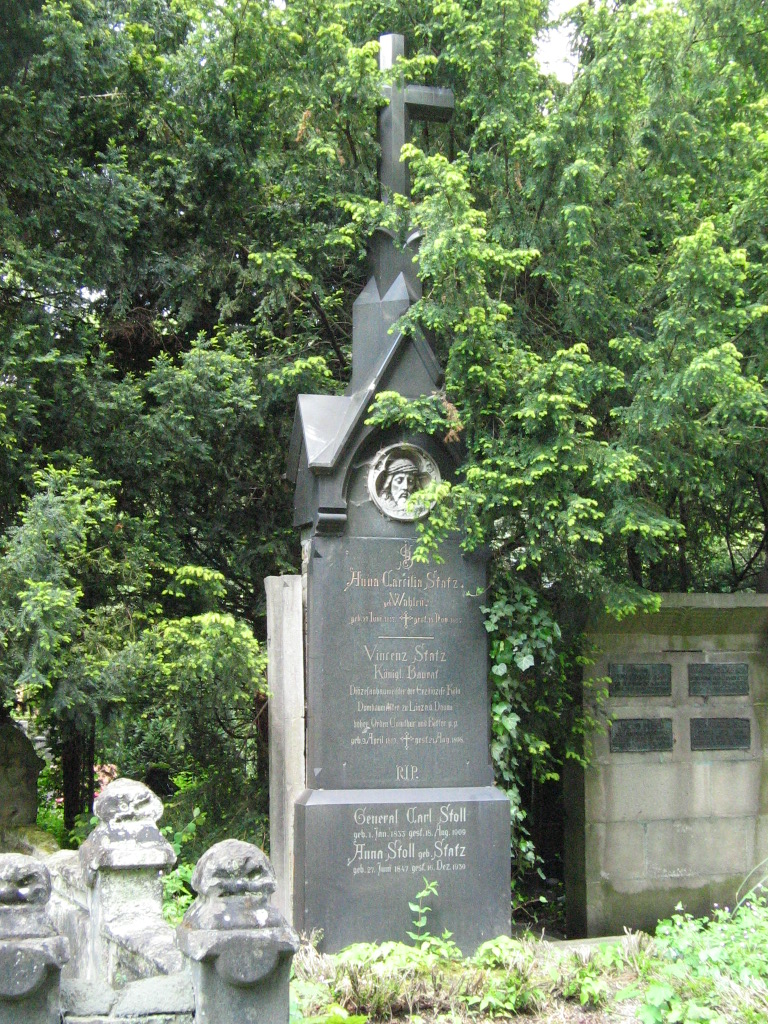
Gravestone of Vincenz Statz in the Melaten-Friedhof cemetery in Cologne (MA zwischen Lit. V und W).

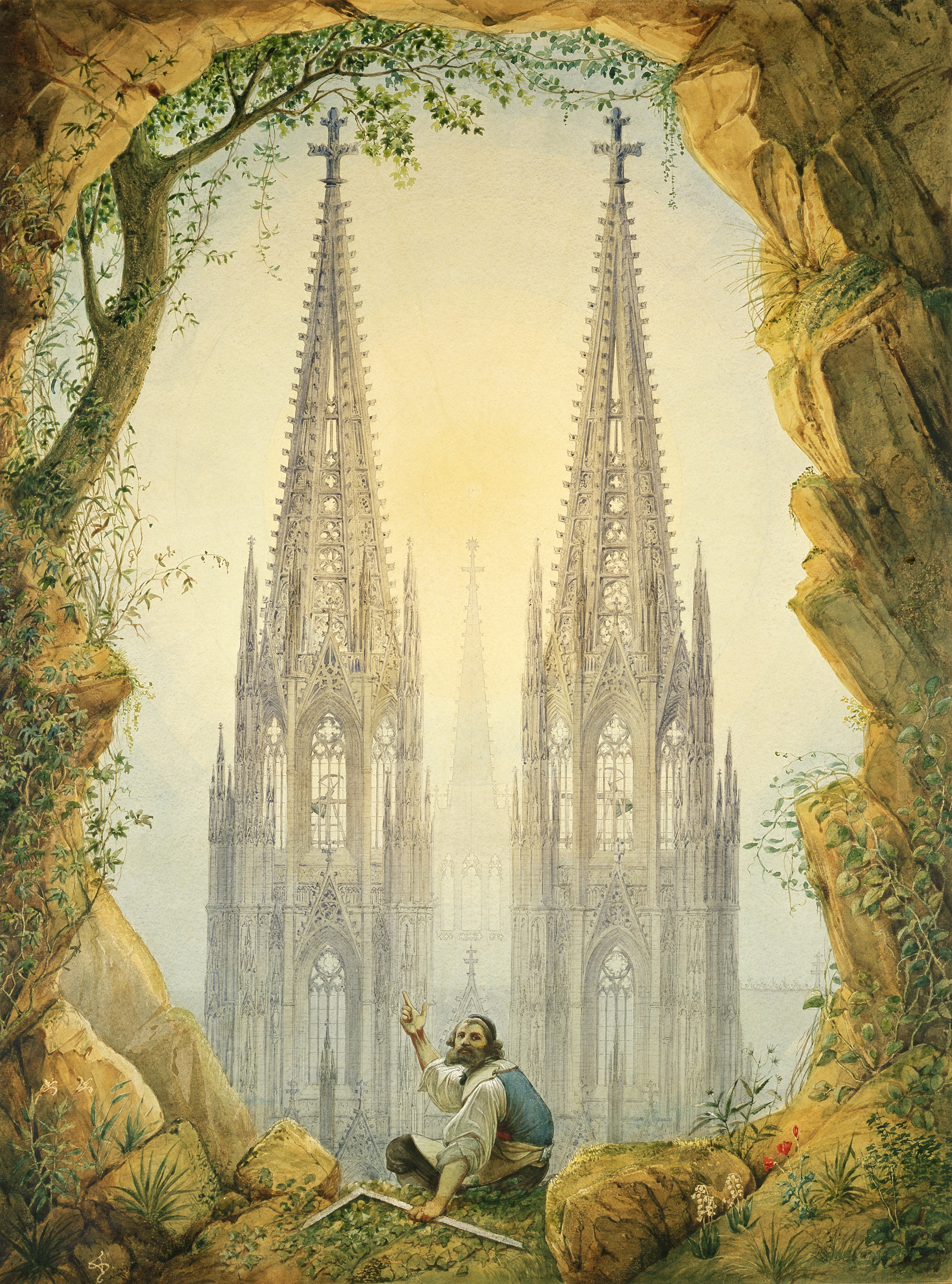
Vincenz Statz: „Und fertig wird er doch!“, showing a vision of the completed spires of Cologne Cathedral, 1861, watercolour on paper, Wallraf-Richartz-Museum & Fondation Corboud Köln; Inventar Z 1704

Vincenz Statz (9 April 1819 – 21 August 1898) was a Neo-Gothic German architect, mainly active in the Rhineland.

== Bibliography (in German) ==
- Pfarrgemeinderat Neuss-Grefrath (Hrsg.): Festschrift zum 125-jährigen Jubiläum der St. Stephanus-Kirche in Neuss-Grefrath – Geschichtliches und Geschichten rund um den Kirchturm. Neuss 1989
- Manfred Böckling: St. Cyriakus in Mendig. Redaktion: Karl-Peter Wiemer. – Köln: Rheinischer Verein für Denkmalpflege und Landschaftsschutz 2007 (=Rheinische Kunststätten, Heft 500).
- Wolfram Hagspiel: Das "St.-Claren-Viertel" – seine bauliche und städtebauliche Entwicklung bis zur Gegenwart. In: Am Römerturm. Zwei Jahrtausende eines Kölner Stadtviertels. Köln 2006.
- Rolf-Bernd Hechler: Anmerkungen zur Neugotik und zu einigen Krefelder Bauten aus dieser Zeit. (=Die Heimat-Zeitschrift für niederrheinische Kultur- und Heimatpflege, 50. Jahrgang). Krefeld 1979, S. 99 ff.
- Christian Kratz: Der Neue Dom zu Linz. In: Oberösterr. Heimatblätter. 48, Linz 1994. S. 3–17
- Christian Kratz: Vincenz Statz und die Neugotik in Deutschland. In: Beiträge zur Stadt Schwelm und ihrer Umgebung. 47, 1998, S. 117–131
- Christian Kratz: St. Donatus in Aachen-Brand. Aachen 2000
- Michael J. Lewis: The Politics of the German Gothic Revival: August Reichensperger (1808–1895). New York 1993
- Heinrich Mann, Willy Weyres: Handbuch zur rheinischen Baukunst des 19. Jahrhunderts. Cologne 1968
- Franz Ronig: Der Kirchenbau des 19. Jahrhunderts im Bistum Trier. In: Kunst des 19. Jh. im Rheinland, Bd. 1: Architektur. Düsseldorf 1980, pp. 195–268
- Dieter Schewe: Der Zehnthof in Sinzig im 19. Jahrhundert: Ein rheinischer Traum aus Hohenzollerns Königsschlössern o. Verlag. o. Jahr.
- Dieter Schewe: Geschichte Sinzigs und seiner Königspfalzen – Angelpunkte der Römer, Karolinger, Staufer zwischen Ober- und Niederrhein 40 bis 1227, Sinzig 2004. ISBN 3-9809438-0-1
- Hans Vogts: Vincenz Statz (1819–1898). Lebensbild und Lebenswerk eines Kölner Baumeisters. Mönchengladbach 1960
- Willy Weyres: Katholische Kirchen im alten Erzbistum Köln und im rheinischen Teil des Bistums Münster. In: Kunst des 19. Jh. im Rheinland, Bd. 1: Architektur. Düsseldorf 1980, S. 75–193
- Willy Weyres: Vincenz Statz (1819–1898). In: Rheinische Lebensbilder. 6, Köln 1975, S. 97–120
- o.V.: Vincenz Statz †. In: Centralblatt der Bauverwaltung, 18. Jahrgang 1898, Nr. 35 (vom 27. August 1898) (PDF; 1,4 MB), S. 415f.
