= Henry IV Seizing the Opportunity to Conclude Peace =

Painting by Peter Paul Rubens

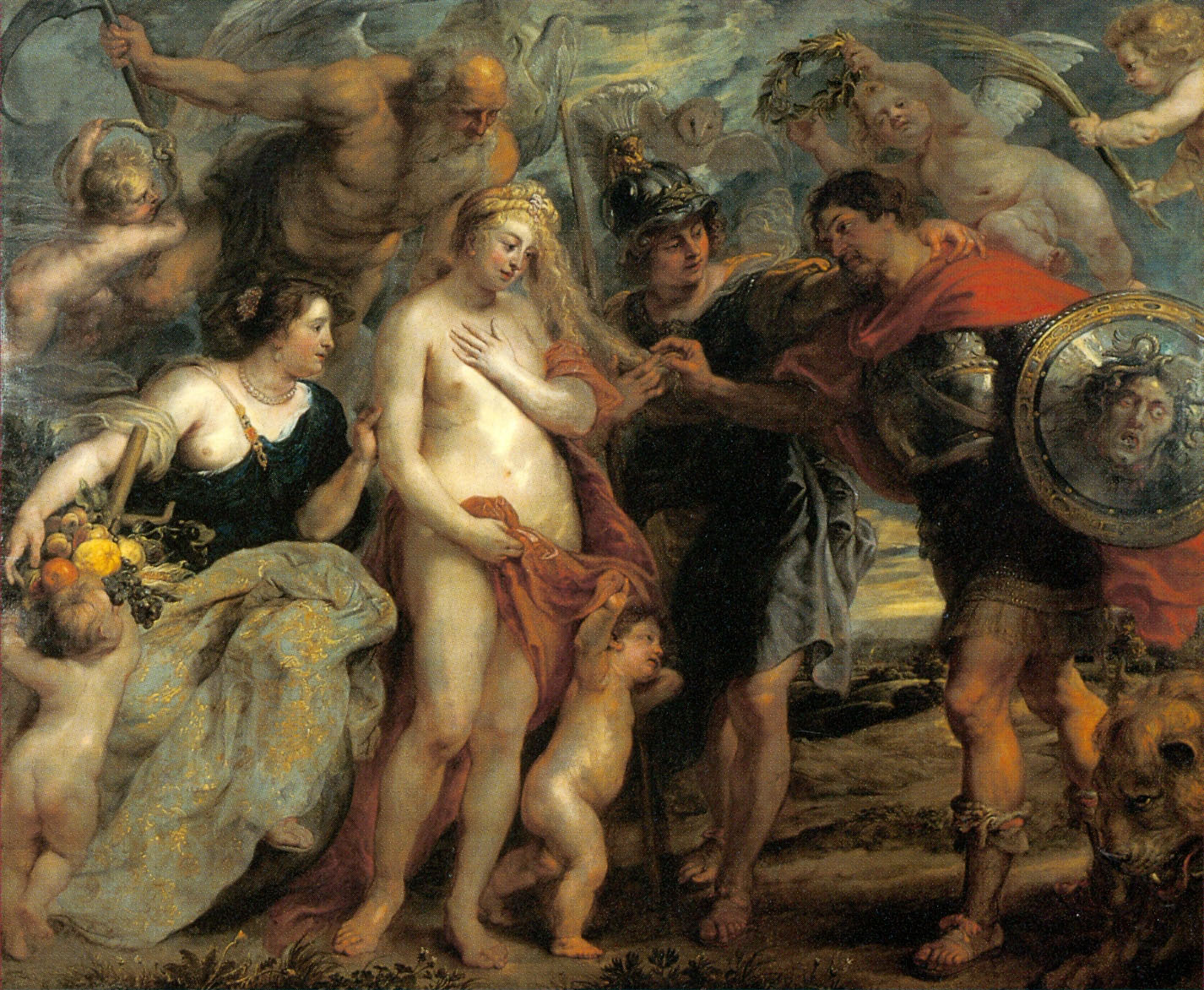
Henry IV Seizing the Opportunity to Conclude Peace (c. 1628) by Peter Paul Rubens

Henry IV Seizing the Opportunity to Conclude Peace is a c.1628 oil on canvas painting by Peter Paul Rubens, now in the Siegerlandmuseum. It is also known as Occasio (the Latin for a favourable opportunity) or The Victorious Hero Takes the Opportunity to Conclude Peace.

Occasio is personified as the blonde nude, with Peace personified as a woman holding a fruit basket and Saturn or Time pushing her forward towards Minerva and the laurel-wreathed hero with the head of Medusa on his shield. A sketch survives in the Liechtenstein Princely Collections, seemingly part of the same project as The Victory of Henry IV at Coutras. Their similar dimensions link them to the same project, possibly a set of tapestries showing the life of Henry IV of France as a sequel to the Marie de' Medici cycle.
