= Eduard Trier =

German art historian (1920–2009)

Eduard Trier (4 January 1920 - 27 June 2009) was a German art historian, exhibition curator and academic. From 1965 to 1972 he was director of the Kunstakademie Düsseldorf. He also wrote several pieces on modern art.

== Career ==
He was born in Cologne to Helene and Hans Trier, the latter being a postal worker. His elder brother Hann Trier became a painter. From 1938 he attended the Gymnasium Kreuzgasse in Cologne and he was later conscripted. He was captured by American forces and on his release from captivity he studied art history at the University of Cologne and the University of Bonn, becoming particularly interested in 14th and 15th century art and late medieval secular iconography, but also in contemporary art.

From 1948 he wrote art criticism for daily newspapers and magazines such as the Bonner General-Anzeiger, the Frankfurter Allgemeine Zeitung and Die Zeit. Under Hermann Schnitzler he catalogued the sculptures in the Schnütgen Museum in Cologne. In 1952 Trier gained his doctorate with a thesis on the medieval wooden sculptures of eight prophets in Cologne City Hall.

In 1953 he married Edith Brabender, an art restorer from Cologne, and they had three children, including Marcus Trier (born 1962). He died in Cologne.

== Works (in German) ==
- Die Propheten-Figuren des Kölner Rathauses. In: Wallraf-Richartz-Jahrbuch, ISSN 0083-7105, 15. Jahrgang 1953, S. 79–102.
- Ein Beitrag zur Profan Ikonographie des Mittelalters. In: Wallraf-Richartz-Jahrbuch, ISSN 0083-7105, 19. Jahrgang 1957, S. 193–224.
- Moderne Plastik. Von Auguste Rodin bis Marino Marini. Gebr. Mann, Berlin 1954.
- Als Freigelassener im Bonner Vorfrühling. In: Bonn. Jahre des Aufbruchs. General-Anzeiger, Bonn 1986.
- Bildhauertheorien im 20. Jahrhundert. neu bearbeitete, verbesserte und erweiterte 5. Auflage, Gebr. Mann, Berlin 1999, ISBN 3-7861-1879-5.
- Schriften zu Max Ernst. (Herausgegeben von Jürgen Pech) Wienand, Köln 2000, ISBN 3-87909-337-7.
- (in collaboration with Willy Weyres as editor): Kunst des 19. Jahrhunderts im Rheinland. 5 Bände, Schwann, Düsseldorf 1980, ISBN 3-590-30251-8.

== Bibliography ==
- (in German) Justus Müller Hofstede, Werner Spies (ed.): Festschrift für Eduard Trier zum 60. Geburtstag. Gebr. Mann, Berlin 1981, ISBN 3-7861-1269-X.
- (in German) Artar Valstar, Dieter Schütz (ed.): Von Hildebrand bis Kricke. Beiträge zur Kunst des 19. und 20. Jahrhunderts. (Schülergabe für Eduard Trier zum 7. Februar 1985) Bonn 1985, ISBN 3-416-01874-5.
