= Willy Weyres =

German architect (1903–1989)

Willy Weyres (31 December – 1903 – 18 May 1989) was a German architect and academic teacher. He was Kölner Dombaumeister from 1944 to 1972, diocesan master builder for the Archdiocese of Cologne for more than ten years, and full professor of architectural history and monument preservation at the RWTH Aachen from 1955 until his retirement in 1972. Under his leadership, the Cologne Cathedral was restored and further developed after the Second World War.

== Life ==
Born in Oberhausen, Weyres first studied theology and history of art at the Rheinische Friedrich-Wilhelms-Universität Bonn from 1922 to 1924. His teachers included Wilhelm Neuß, Wilhelm Worringer, Heribert Reiners and Paul Clemen. The latter in particular convinced him to study architecture, whereupon Weyres transferred to the Rheinisch Westfälische Technische Hochschule in Aachen in 1924, where Hans Karlinger was one of his teachers. Karlinger's understanding of modern art and the compatibility of "old" and modern art is considered formative for Weyres' further path.

After completing his architecture studies in 1928, Weyres took a semester of stained glass at the Kölner Werkschulen with Jan Thorn Prikker. This was followed by interim positions as a research assistant and architect with the Provincial Conservator from 1930 to 1932, and from 1932 to 1935, work as a freelance architect specialising in monument preservation. He restored the Stiftskirche St. Martin und St. Severus, the Basilica of St. Quirinus, Neuss and the Limburg Cathedral. From 1935 to 1939, he was the diocesan building councillor for the Diocese of Limburg.

From 1940, Weyres was responsible for the protection of works of art in the Rhineland on behalf of the Provincial Conservator. His task was to secure works of art on architectural monuments as well as the removal and safe recovery of movable art objects. In November 1944, he was appointed provisional cathedral architect and from this time onwards was responsible for the already heavily damaged Cologne Cathedral. This included swiftly taking appropriate security measures for the building after each bombing raid. Even before the end of the war, on 13 April 1945, Weyres began repair work on the cathedral. Shortly afterwards, he officially took over the office of cathedral architect, which he held until 1972.

In 1948, Weyres was awarded a doctorate from the Rhenish-Westphalian Technical University of Aachen with a thesis on the west building of the St.-Viktor-Dom in Xanten.

As early as 1945, Weyres had also been appointed as Cologne's diocesan architect and was thus responsible for the reconstruction of the approximately 200 destroyed churches in the archdiocese as well as around 25 new buildings until 1955.

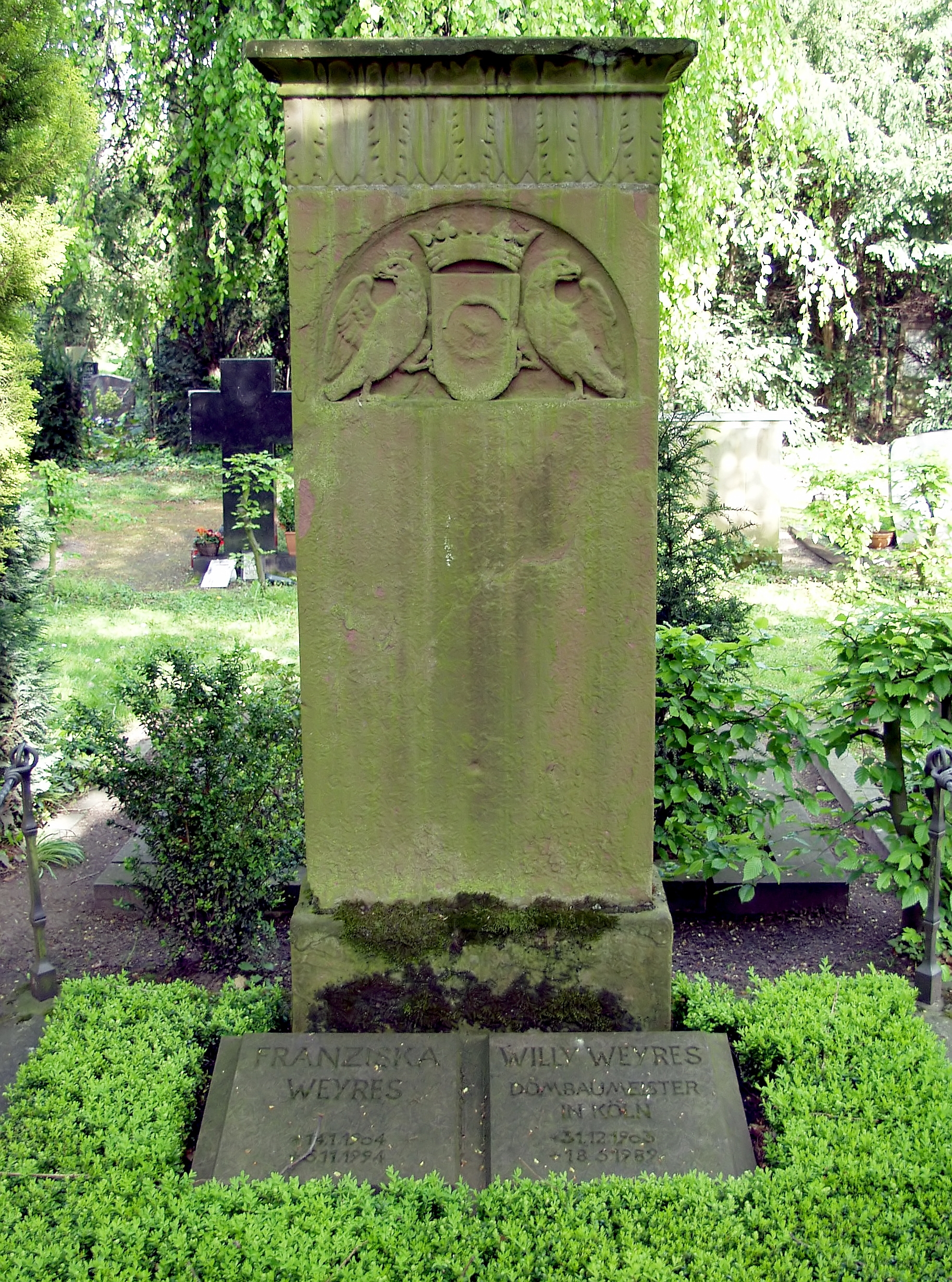
Gravesite at the Melaten-Friedhof in Cologne

In 1955, Weyres was appointed full professor to the chair of architectural history and monument preservation at the RWTH Aachen. In addition to medieval architecture, the focus of his research was 19th century architecture, on which he wrote a comprehensive work and supervised numerous dissertations. His successor in the chair of building history and monument preservation was Günter Urban. Even as emeritus professor, Weyres continued to supervise doctoral students until his death.

After his retirement and resignation as cathedral architect in 1972, Weyres continued to scientifically accompany the archaeological excavations under the Cologne Cathedral, which he had led since 1963. In 1988, he published the comprehensive work Die vorgotischen Bischofskirchen unter dem Kölner Dom on the early history of the cathedral.

Weyres starb am 18. Mai 1989 in Aachen at the age of 88.

== Work ==
=== Self-employed architect and monument conservator ===
As a young architect specialising in the preservation of monuments, Weyres was mainly involved in the restoration of numerous churches in the Rhineland and the Eifel in the 1930s. During the restoration of the Stiftskirche in Münstermaifeld, wall paintings from the 13th to 15th centuries were uncovered, followed by further repairs, but also extensions, painting of interiors or the design of church windows.

In 1937, one of the few new churches of this time was built in the Eifel village of Rinnen near Kall according to designs by Weyres.

=== Cathedral master builder during the period of reconstruction ===
At the end of the war, Weyresʼ greatest task was the restoration of Cologne Cathedral, which had suffered considerable damage in the Second World War, even if it appeared comparatively undamaged in the extensively destroyed city. Numerous bombs had hit the roof trusses, 12 vaults had collapsed or been severely damaged, window tracery had been destroyed, the lead roofing had been almost completely torn away, the crossing tower had been damaged and the old organ had been completely destroyed. The western part was much more severely damaged than the older eastern part with the inner choir.

Under Weyresʼ direction, the roofs were first remade, with the help of an American art protection officer to procure the materials. An early rescue measure was also directed at the south transept, whose southwest corner had suffered severe damage from a bomb strike. Weyres and his colleagues succeeded in restoring the eastern part of the cathedral - ambulatory, transepts and the two eastern bays of the nave - to such an extent by the 700th anniversary of the laying of the foundation stone on 15 August 1948 that the celebrations desired by Cardinal Josef Frings could take place in the cathedral. Weyres had the still unrenovated nave closed off to the west with a temporary partition wall.

Weyres pushed ahead with an important decision as early as 1945: he convinced the cathedral chapter to use the time of the restoration work for archaeological excavations under the cathedral. At his suggestion, Otto Doppelfeld was entrusted with this task in 1945. As early as 1946, Doppelfeld found parts of the previous building during the excavations, and further excavations revealed finds dating back to the 4th century AD. Weyres also made the decision, which was considered far-sighted, not to fill in the site about two metres below the current floor, but to secure it statically with concrete and make it permanently accessible.

The restoration work always included new creations as well as pure reconstructions for Weyres. He engaged young and established artists who introduced numerous modern elements and sculptures to the freely designed components that did not directly affect the architectural form as a whole. Weyres' successor in office, his pupil Arnold Wolff, praised these works as "zones of young, fresh sculpture typical of the time, which fit harmoniously into the cathedral's overall inventory"; in contrast, Barbara Schock-Werner, cathedral master builder from 1999 to 2012, deplored the frequent lack of artistic or craftsmanship quality.

On the other hand, the new south portal doors by the artist Ewald Mataré, whose additional vision of a radically changed, two-dimensional overall façade of the south transept was, however, not implemented, are considered to be artistically successful.

The destroyed organ was replaced by a new one, for which Weyres had a completely new concrete structure built on the east side of the northern transept. The painting of the lower sides of the gallery were carried out by the artist Peter Hecker. Unlike the large, modern west window by Vincenz Pieper from 1963, which was restored to its 1870 state under Arnold Wolff in 1980, the organ gallery, despite a certain aesthetic displeasure in the cathedral, belongs to the building for Barbara Schock-Werner as a typical example of Weyres' work on the cathedral worth preserving.

=== Work as diocesan master builder ===
From 1946 to 1956, in addition to his role as master builder of the cathedral, Weyres was also diocesan master builder for the archdiocese of Cologne and thus responsible for the reconstruction of some 200 destroyed churches in the archdiocese as well as some 25 new buildings.

He drew on architects such as Dominikus and Gottfried Böhm, Hans Schilling and Rudolf Schwarz and significantly promoted modern church building during this period. The former Cologne city conservator Ulrich Krings paid tribute to Weyres as one of the "most important stimulators and course setters" of 1950s architecture in Cologne.

From the point of view of monument conservation, Weyre's work as diocesan architect and that of his contemporaries Karl Band and Wilhelm Hartmann fell into a "creative" phase, in which existing buildings and works of art were preserved and protected, but what had been destroyed was not replaced by "imitative copies" but by modern new creations.

Weyre's approach to the new buildings in the diocese, which was considered successful, was characterised by the idea of "[bringing in] the best architect possible and then [allowing him] the greatest possible degree of freedom".

In addition to restoring and repairing the churches in the archdiocese, Weyres was also responsible as an architect for a number of new buildings. Together with Günter Ständer, Weyres realised the parish church of St. Mary's Assumption in Wuppertal-Nächstebreck in 1953, and together with Kobes Bong among others the parish church of St. Bernhard in Wittlich and the parish church of St. Hedwig in Bonn. Weyres was also involved in the restoration and redecoration of the Romanesque churches of St. Maria im Kapitol and St. Pantaleon.

== Awards ==
- Großkreuz des päpstlichen Order of St. Sylvester (1972)
- Order of Merit of the Federal Republic of Germany I. Classe (1979)
- Deutscher Preis für Denkmalschutz (1981)

== Publications ==
- Das Münster auf dem Maifeld. Münstermaifeld 1932.
- Der Georgsdom zu Limburg. Limburg 1935.
- Der Westbau von St. Viktor in Xanten. Aachen 1948.
- Neue Kirchen im Erzbistum Köln 1945–1956. Düsseldorf 1957.
- Kirchen. Handbuch für den Kirchenbau. Munich 1959.
- with Albrecht Mann: Handbuch zur rheinischen Baukunst des 19. Jahrhunderts 1800–1880. Cologne 1968.
- Draft for the design of the city hall towers of the Aachen City Hall, 1968, not implemented
- with Eduard Trier (ed.): Kunst des 19. Jahrhunderts im Rheinland. 5 volumes, Düsseldorf 1979–1981.
- with Otto Doppelfeld: Die Ausgrabungen im Dom zu Köln. Mainz 1980.
- Die vorgotischen Bischofskirchen in Köln. Cologne 1988.
