= Justus Müller Hofstede =

German art historian (1929–2015)

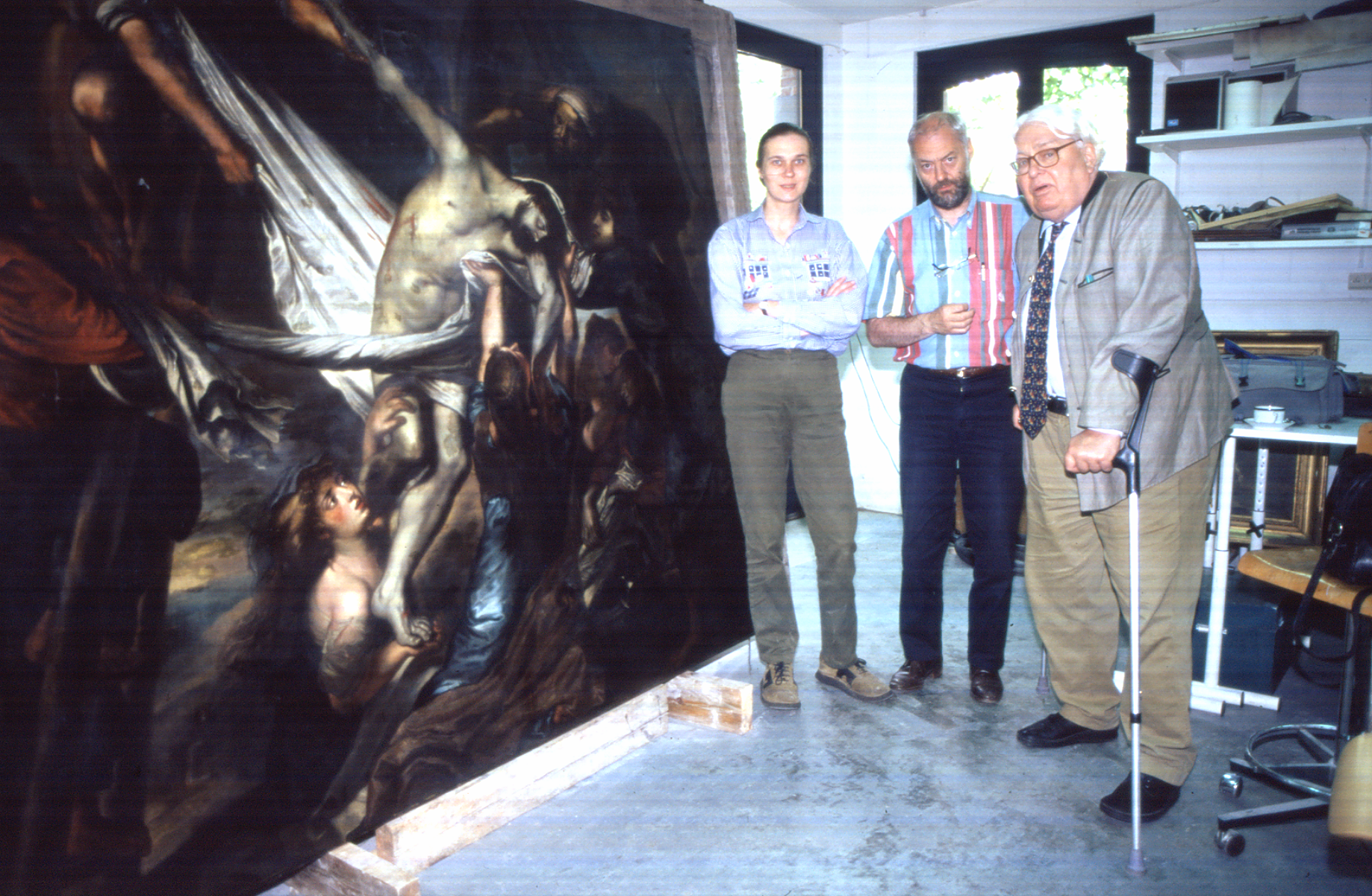
Justus Müller Hofstede (right) with Griet Blankaert and Paul Verbraeken in Ekeren in 2002

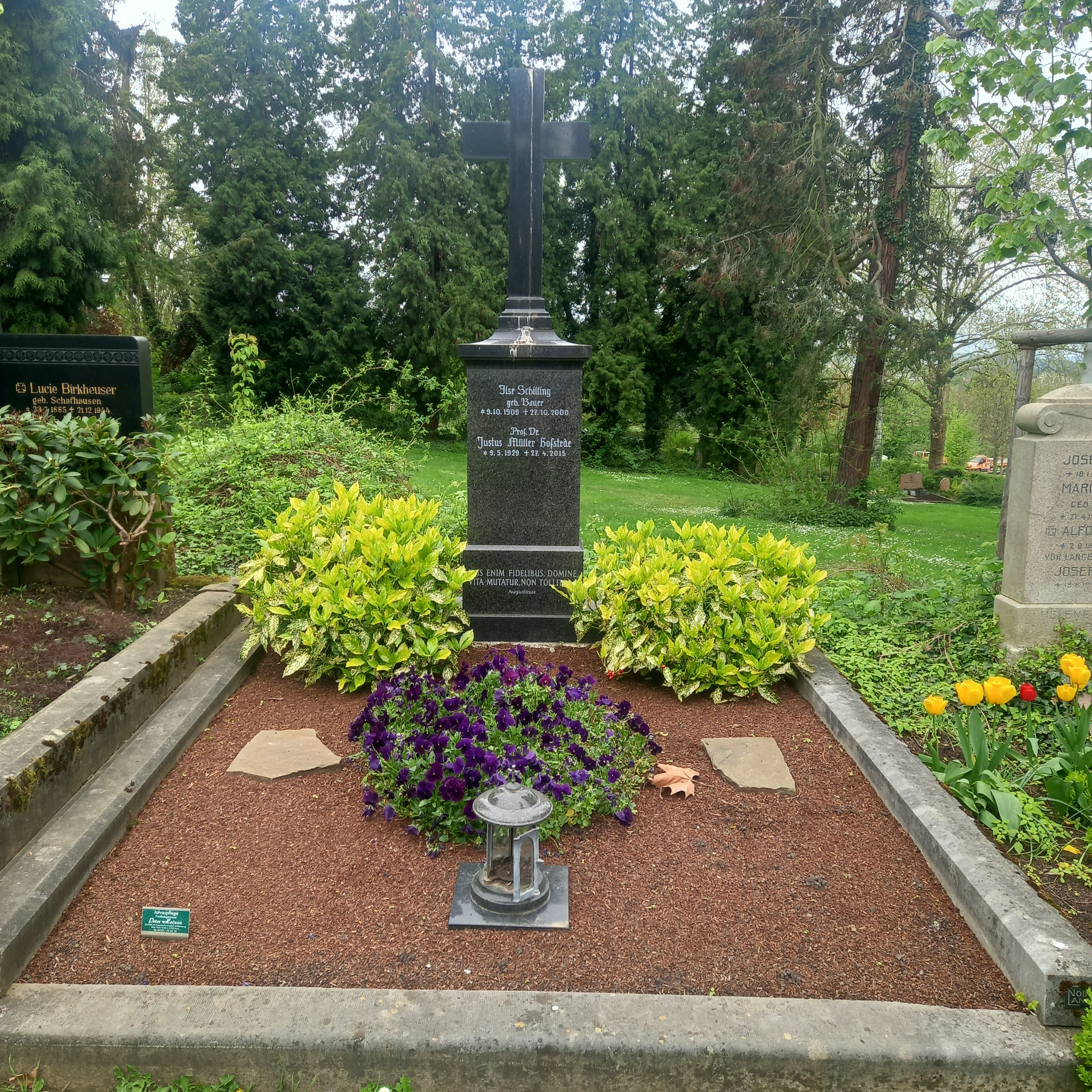
The grave of Justus Müller-Hofstede in the Poppelsdorfer Friedhof in Bonn

Justus Müller Hofstede (9 May 1929 - 27 April 2015) was a German art historian, the son of the art historian Cornelius Müller Hofstede (1898–1974), who had been director of the Gemäldegalerie in Berlin from 1957 to 1964.

== Life ==
Born in Berlin, he received his doctorate from Freiburg University in 1959, habilitating from the University of Bonn with a thesis on Peter Paul Rubens' time in Italy from 1600 to 1608. He was a professor in the latter university's Art Historical Institute. From 1996 to 1998 he was a lecturer on its "The Renaissance in Italy and its European Reception" course on the graduate programme.

From 1977 to 2004 he was chairman of Bonn's Local History and History Association (Bonner Heimat- und Geschichtsverein) and in that role was a co-founder of the Bonn City Museum. In 1985 he received the Rhineland Medal, in 1990 the Cross of the Order of Merit of the Federal Republic of Germany and in 1995 the Officer's Cross of the Order of Merit of the Italian Republic. He died in Bonn.

== Selected works ==
=== Author ===
- Otto van Veen, der Lehrer des P. P. Rubens, Freiburg i. B. 1959 [Maschinenschr. Dissertation]
- Wort und Bild in der niederländischen Kunst und Literatur des 16. und 17. Jahrhunderts, Erftstadt 1984,
- Rubens’ neu entdeckte Kreuzabnahme für Eleonora Gonzaga, Herzogin von Mantua. In: Gerhard Finckh, Nicole Hartje-Grave (ed.): Peter Paul Rubens. Von der Heydt-Museum, Wuppertal 2012, ISBN 978-3-89202-085-1, S. 50–65.

=== Editor ===
- Festschrift für Eduard Trier zum sechzigsten Geburtstag, Gebr. Mann Verlag, Berlin 1981, ISBN 3-7861-1269-X
- Florenz in der Frührenaissance. Kunst – Literatur – Epistolographie in der Sphäre des Humanismus, CMZ-Verlag, Rheinbach 2002, ISBN 3-87062-090-0

== Bibliography (in German) ==
- Studien zur Niederländischen Kunst. Festschrift für Justus Müller Hofstede. (= Wallraf-Richartz Jahrbuch. Westdeutsches Jahrbuch für Kunstgeschichte. Bd. 55) Köln: DuMont Schauberg. 1994.
- Bonner Geschichtsblätter. Bd. 53/54, Bonn 2004. ISSN 0068-0052, darin:
  - Heijo Klein: Der Kunsthistoriker Justus Müller Hofstede
  - Manfred van Rey: Prof. Dr. Justus Müller Hofstede als Vorsitzender des Bonner Heimat- und Geschichtsvereins
