= The Descent from the Cross (Rubens, 1612–1614) =

Painting by Peter Paul Rubens

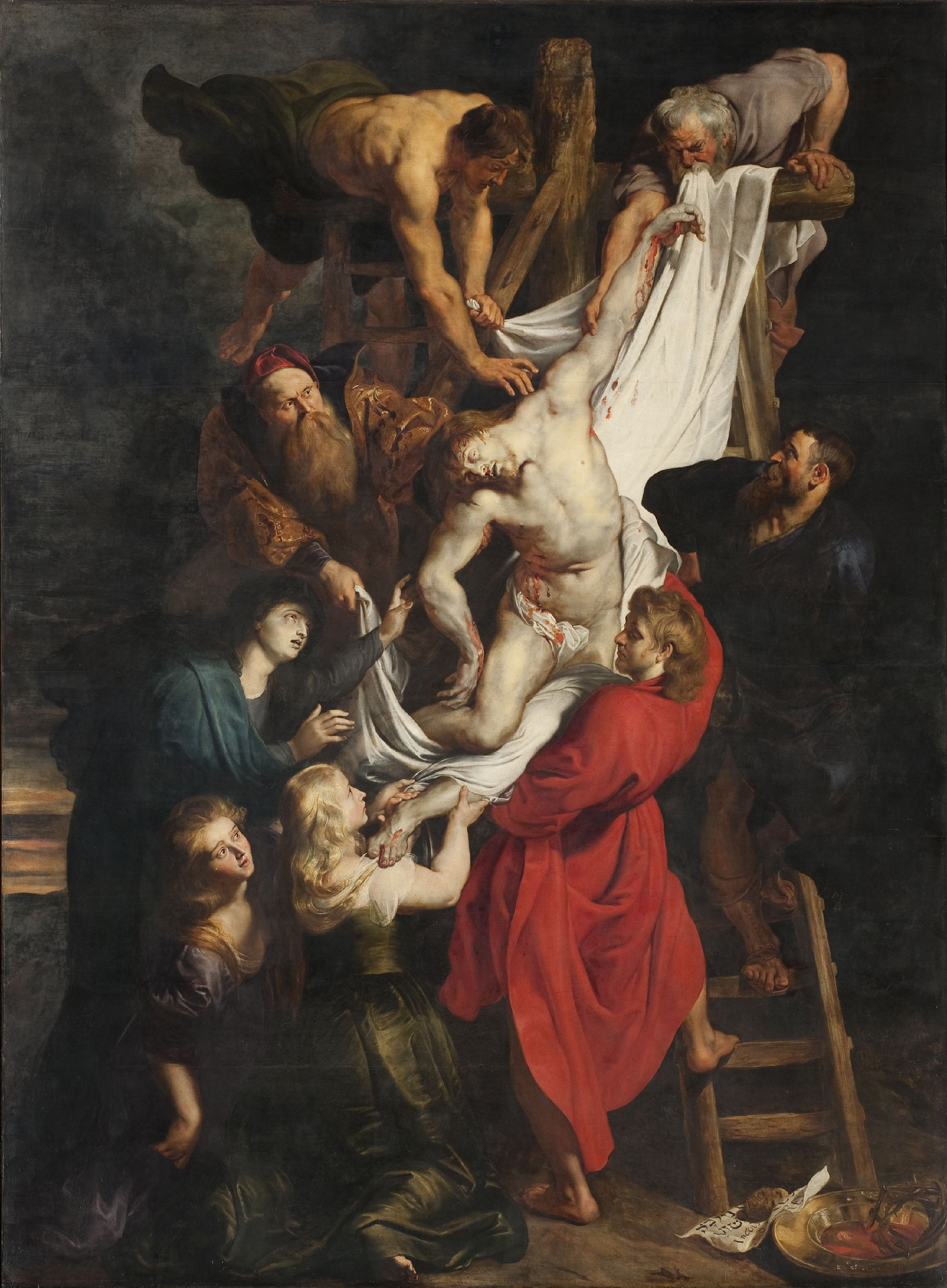
- Artist: Peter Paul Rubens
- Year: 1612–1614
- Medium: Oil on panel
- Dimensions: 420.5 cm × 320 cm (165.6 in × 130 in)
- Location: Cathedral of Our Lady, Antwerp

The Descent from the Cross is the central panel of a triptych painting by the Baroque artist Peter Paul Rubens in 1612–1614. It is still in its original place, the Cathedral of Our Lady, Antwerp, Belgium. The painting is considered to be one of Rubens' masterpieces. The painting depicts the moment when the body of Jesus Christ is taken down from the cross after his crucifixion. The subject was one Rubens returned to again and again in his career. The artwork was commissioned on September 7, 1611, by the Confraternity of the Arquebusiers, whose patron saint was St. Christopher.

== History ==
In general, the painting has its origins in the Italian artistic tradition, influenced by the Mannerist style of artists such as Francesco Salviati, Federico Barocci, Jacopino del Conte, Cigoli, and Daniele da Volterra. These artists may have been inspired by the ideas of Michelangelo and earlier examples from the fifteenth century. However, Rubens' painting stands apart from the dramatic Italian artists in its depiction of the ritualistic and solemn lowering of Christ's body from the Cross into the arms of the believers.

In 1794, the occupying French army removed this painting and The Elevation of the Cross and sent them to the Louvre. After the end of the Napoleonic Wars, they were returned to the cathedral in 1815.

Along with The Elevation of The Cross, The Descent From The Cross was stolen again in 1914 by the Imperial German Army and taken to Berlin, where both triptychs were kept in the Berlin Palace until after the Armistice of November 11, 1918 when they were returned to the Cathedral.

=== Counter-Reformation Context ===
In The Descent from the Cross, Rubens highlights the triumphant element of the cross. The painting depicts the moment when Christ's body is taken down from the cross, and is similarly full of drama and emotion. The figures in the painting are depicted with exaggerated expressions of grief and sadness, emphasizing the emotional impact of Christ's death. The painting invites the viewer to reflect on the importance of Christ's sacrifice and to deepen their emotional devotion to him. The image serves to remind the faithful of Christ's divine nature. During the Counter-Reformation period, Catholic art required portrayal of the suffering Savior that was more heroic and godly in appearance. Beside the interpretation of Christ's sacrifice, the Catholic Church during the Counter Reformation also required accurate depictions of biblical events such as the Life of the Virgin, the Life of Christ, and the stories of the saints recommended after the Council of Trent.

Rubens transformed the representation of the Virgin from a portrayal of frailty and agony to one of fortitude and bravery based on the Gospel of Saint John (Jn.19:25). The painting emphasis the aspect of Counter Reformation Catholicism. In the Co-redemptrix doctrine, the Virgin is a crucial figure. She shares the work of Redemption with her Son and participates in the divine task of saving humanity. Mary's role as a co-Redeemer was emphasized, in contrast to Protestants who limited or even denied the importance of honoring Mary.

The piece of art portrays Saint Christopher, who belongs to the group of Fourteen Holy Helpers. It combines the popular story of a devout giant carrying the baby Jesus on his back across a river with a representation that emphasizes humanistic ennoblement. While some humanists regarded the veneration of Saint Christopher as a form of superstition, Saint Christopher is used here as a metaphor for the Eucharist, which is a central Catholic belief in the physical presence of Christ's body during Mass and a theme that contrasts with Protestant views.

Saint Christopher (left outer door)
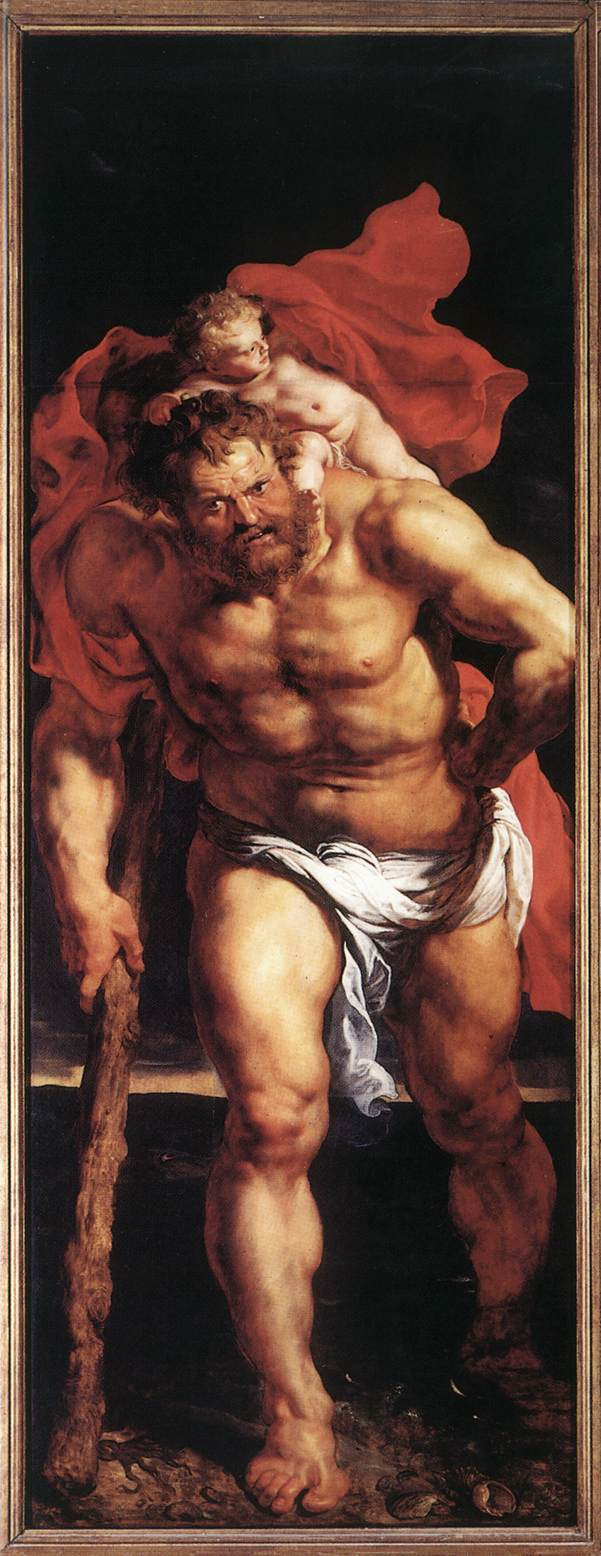
- Artist: Peter Paul Rubens
- Year: 1612–1614
- Medium: Oil on panel
- Dimensions: 421 cm × 153 cm (166 in × 60 in)
- Location: Cathedral of Our Lady, Antwerp

== Subject Matter ==
The deposition of the dead Christ from the Cross has been a symbolic theme since the fifteen century. Rubens got the idea for the painting Descent from the Cross before he was commissioned by the Harquebusiers. Unlike The Descent from the Cross (van der Weyden), Christ's body is lowered down carefully by group of men. Ruben uses the white shroud that is around Christ’s body, to make it more complicated.

=== Scriptural Basis ===
The Descent from the Cross, also known as the Deposition of Christ, is a subject in Christian art that is based on several passages in the Bible. The main scriptural basis for this subject can be found in the Gospels of Matthew (Mt. 27: 57-60), Gospels of Mark (Mk. 15:43-46), Gospels of Luke (Lk. 23:50-53), and Gospels of John (Jn. 19:38-42), which describe the events surrounding Jesus' death and burial. There was a man from Arimathea, named Joseph, who is a disciple of Jesus. Going to Pilate, he asked for Jesus’ body, and Pilate granted his request. Joseph proceeded to wrap the body in a clean linen cloth, and placed it in a tomb that he had carved from rock.

== Composition ==
Outside the shutters of the triptych, Ruben illustrates the guild's patron, Christopher, or Christophorus, "Christ-bearer", carrying the Christ across the stream, and the Hermit. Inside the panel, the central of the triptych depicts the body of Christ being lowered from the cross by a group of men. The Visitation, Mary who is carrying Christ Child, is described on the left panel. The Presentation in the Temple, The old man Simeon hold the Child in his arm is described on the right panel. The Descent from the Cross is divided into three sections, each depicting a different scene. The Descent features two scenes on the sides that are set in distinct architectural environments.

=== The Visitation ===
On the left side, the setting is a bridge elevated high up, featuring a classical portico. Here, a pregnant Virgin Mary encounters her older cousin Elizabeth, who is also pregnant and will become the mother of John Baptist.

=== The Presentation of Christ ===
On the right side, the scene takes place in a meticulously designed temple interior, where the High Priest is presented with the Christ-child. These scenes share a common theme of the beginning of Christ's life, which stands in contrast to the central panel that portrays his end.

=== The Deposition ===
The focal point of the painting is in the center panel, which portrays a group of interlocking figures arranged in an elliptical shape around the lifeless body of Jesus. St. John, dressed in a scarlet cloak and with one foot on a ladder for support, is the primary figure supporting the weight of Jesus. Joseph of Arimathea is positioned diagonally across from St. John to assist him. Nicodemus is shown above them on the ladder, while two men leaning over the crossbar are lowering Jesus' body, with one holding the winding sheet between his teeth to free his hands. Mary Magdalen and Mary Cleophas kneel at the foot of the cross, while the Virgin Mary is standing upright, her sorrow and anguish expressed in her pale face rather than her posture.

The Virgin, standing at the foot of the sacrificial tree, extends her arms towards her Son. On the ground are seen the superscription and a copper basin where the crown of thorns and the nails of the Crucifixion lie in the congealed blood. The crowd, elated by the spectacle of torture, has departed from Golgotha as daylight fades. After the sacrifice of Calvary, as it is called in Scripture, the sad, dark sky is crossed by a light that illumines the shoulders of the workmen, whose bold posture recalls the composition by Daniele da Volterra.

All of the figures are strongly lit, creating a relief-like effect that is accentuated by the dark background. The background opens up to a glimpse of the evening sky on the left side of the painting.

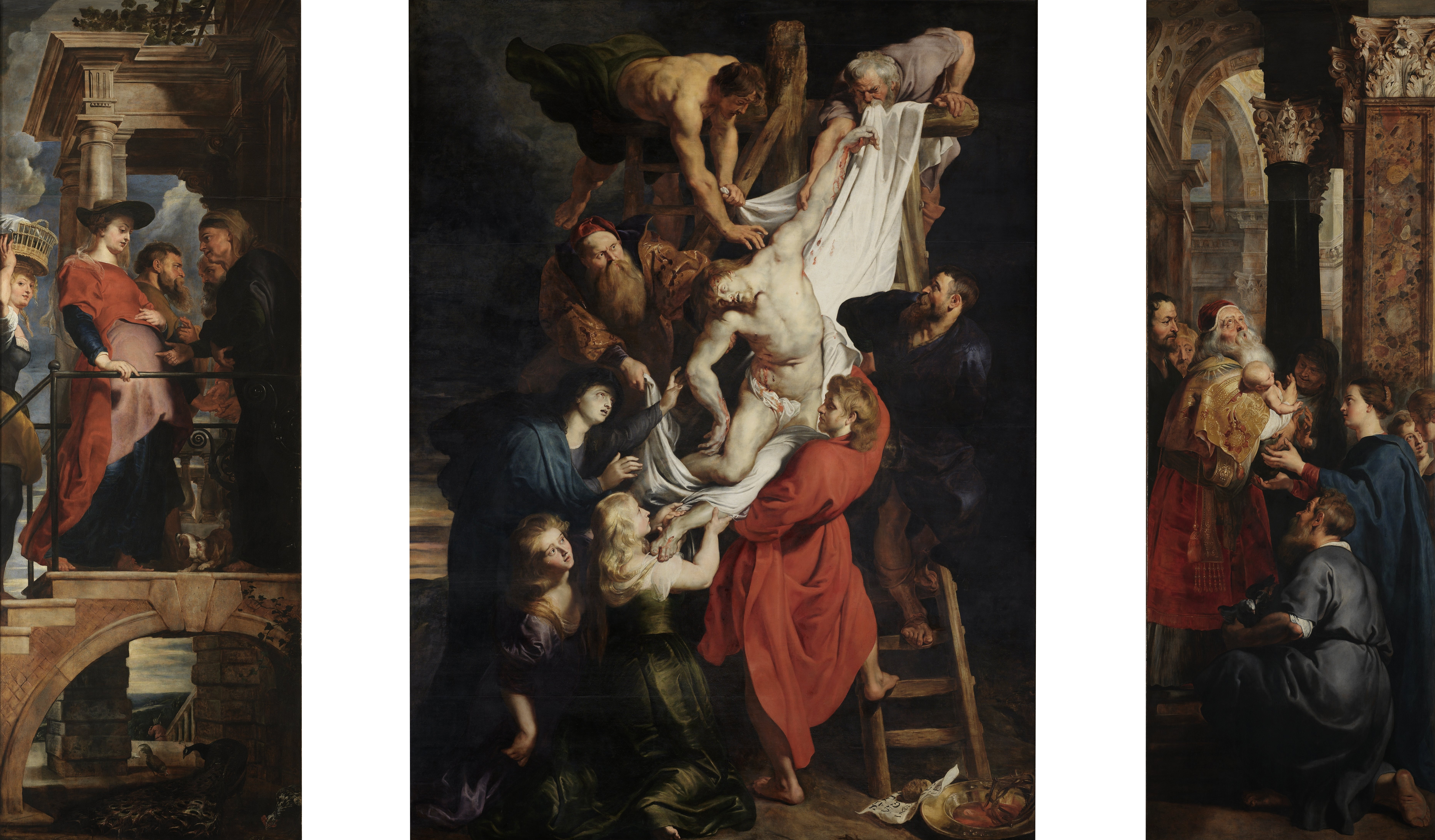
The triptych describes the Visitation, the Descent from the Cross, and the Presentation of Jesus at the Temple.

== Other versions ==
In addition to the original work for Antwerp, Rubens painted three or more other versions exploring the same theme.

Version	Date Painted	Current Location
The Descent from the Cross (Rubens, 1617)	1616–17	Palais des Beaux-Arts de Lille
The Descent from the Cross (Rubens)	c. 1616	Courtauld Gallery, London
The Descent from the Cross (Rubens, 1618)	1617–18	Hermitage Museum
The Kalisz Rubens		Lost

== See also ==
- The Descent from the Cross (Rubens), for other paintings by Rubens of the same title

== Gallery ==
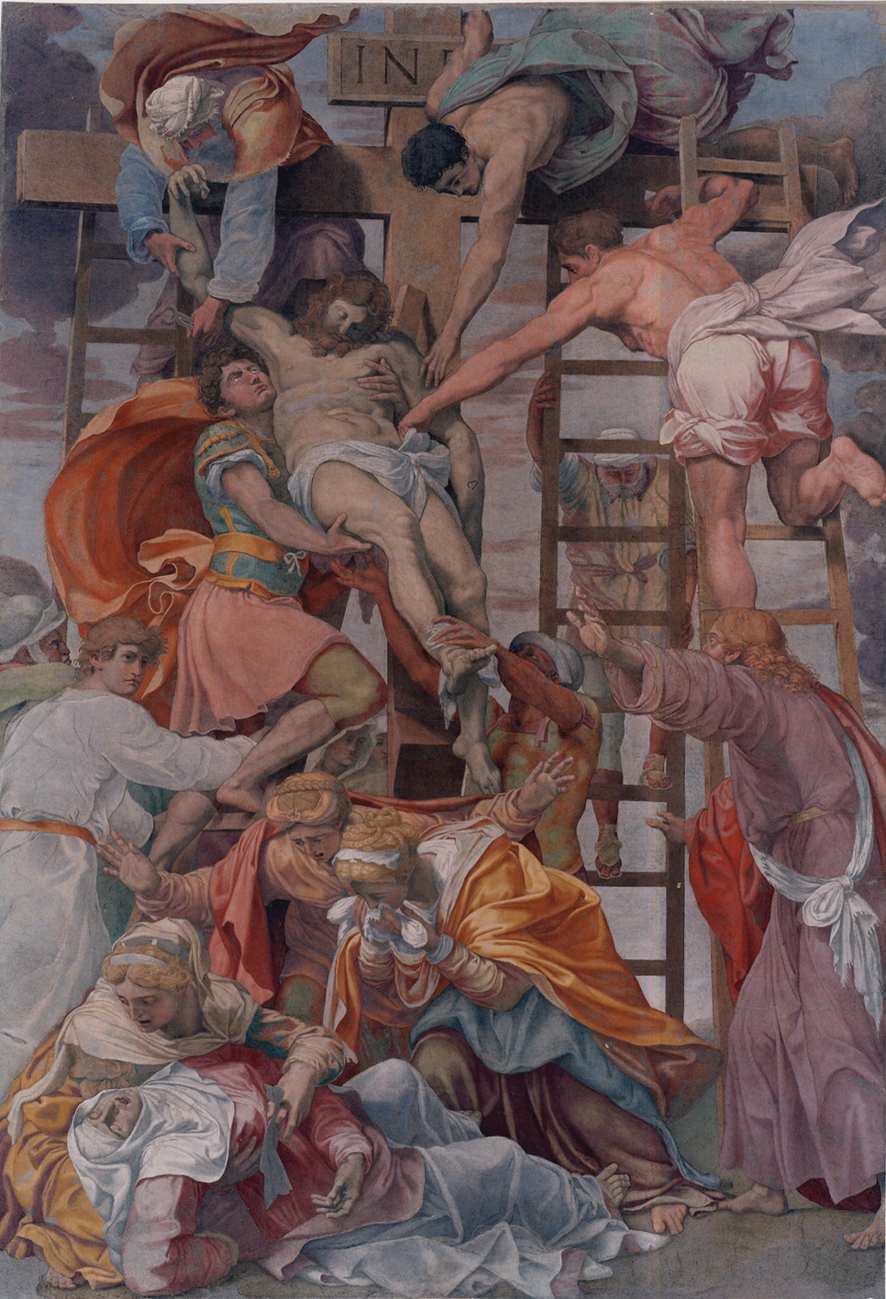
Descent from the Cross (c. 1545), before its 2004 restoration - Daniele da Volterra - Trinità dei Monti, Rome

The Descent from the Cross - detail - Peter Paul Rubens - 1612 - Antwerp Cathedral

== Sources ==
- Jaffé, M. (1989). Catalogo completo di Rubens. Rizzoli.
- Martin, John R. (editor). Rubens: The Antwerp Altarpieces – The Raising of the Cross and the Descent from the Cross – Norton Critical Studies in Art History. Norton & Company.
