= The Descent from the Cross (Rubens) =

The Descent from the Cross may refer to one of several paintings by Peter Paul Rubens:

- The Descent from the Cross (Rubens, 1600–1602), Siegerland-Museum, Siegen, Oberes Schloss
- The Descent from the Cross (Rubens, 1612–1614), Antwerp Cathedral
- The Descent from the Cross (Rubens, 1617), Palais des Beaux-Arts de Lille
- The Descent from the Cross (Rubens, 1618), Hermitage Museum, St Petersburg
