= Oberes Schloss (Siegen) =

Coordinates: 50°52′32.50″N 8°1′48″E

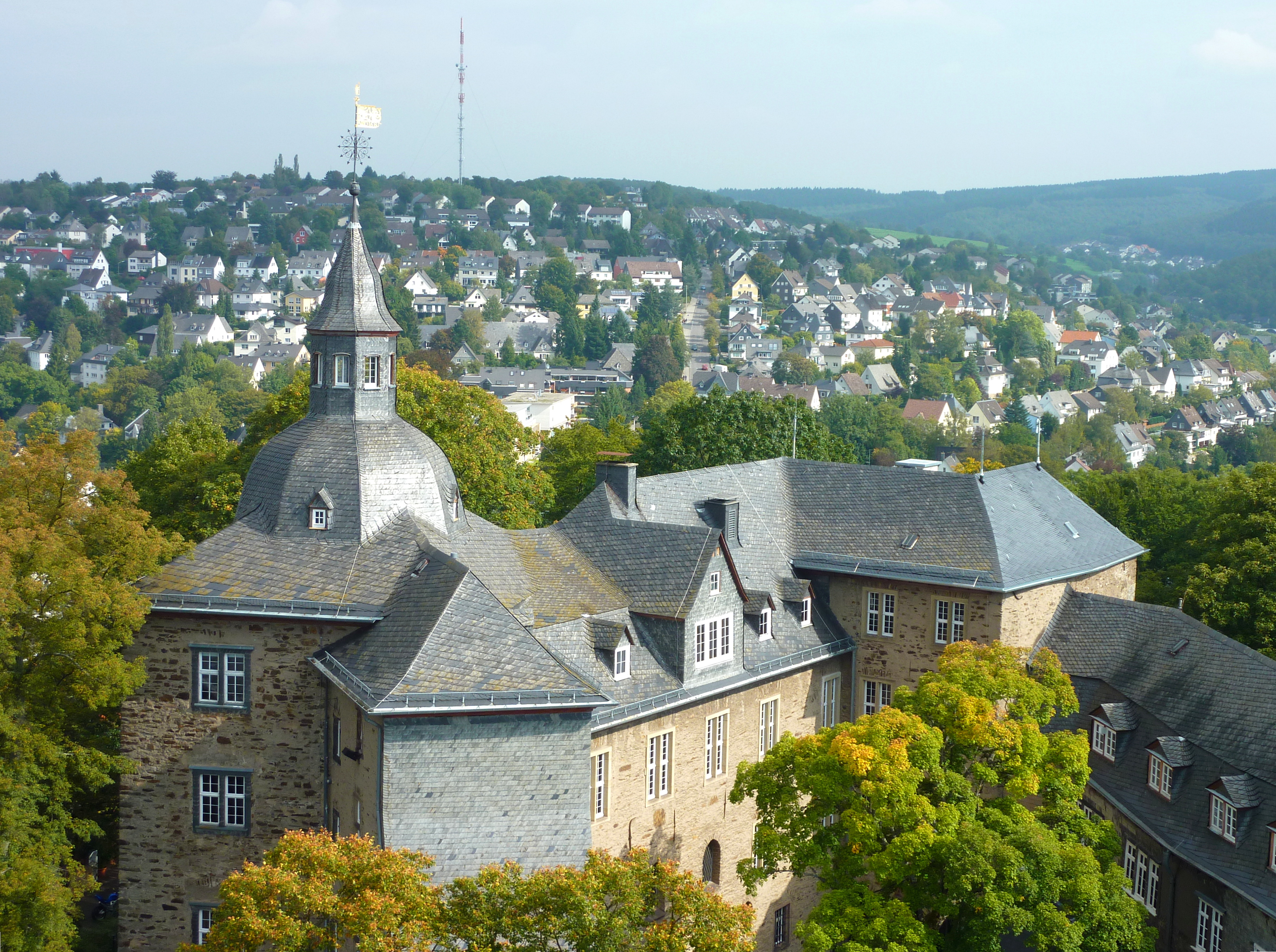
The buildings on the Kernburg. View from the southwest, with the Giersberg in the background.

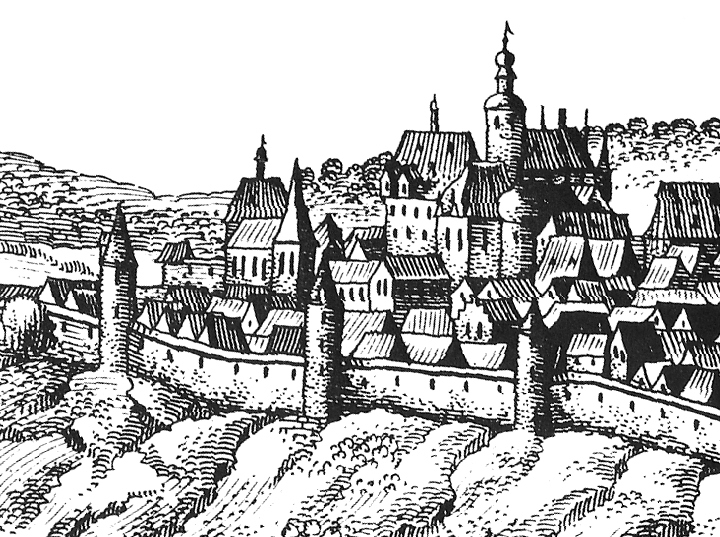
Siegen and the Obere Schloss (c. 1600)

The Obere Schloss is a castle on the 307 m high Siegberg in the German town of Siegen. It was originally a medieval hill castle initially jointly owned by the Prince Bishop of Cologne and the Count of Nassau. Later it became the sole property of the Nassau family. Partially rebuilt, it served as a residence for a time and now houses the Siegerlandmuseum.

== History ==
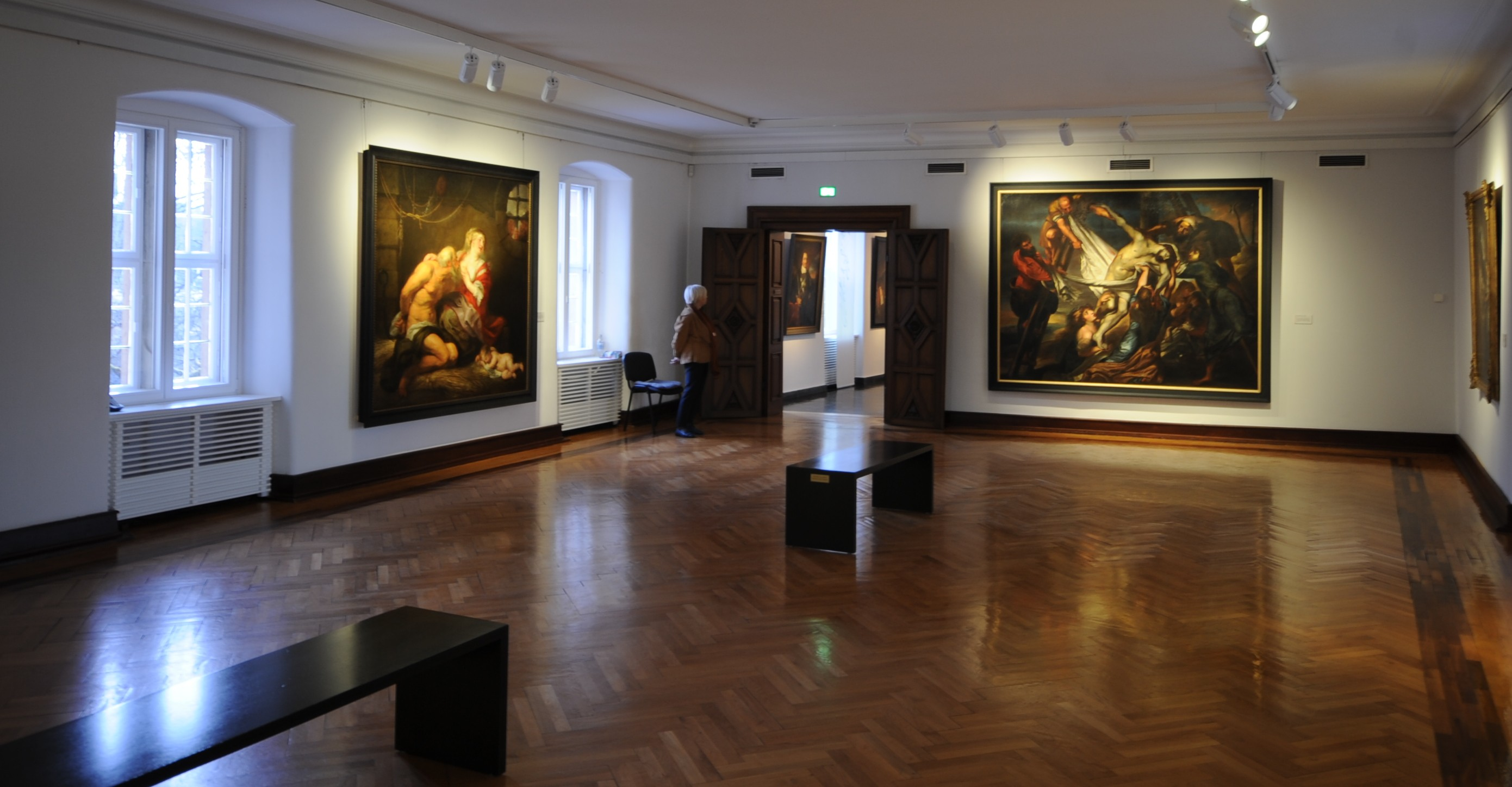
The Rubens Hall with Rubens' Descent from the Cross (2018).

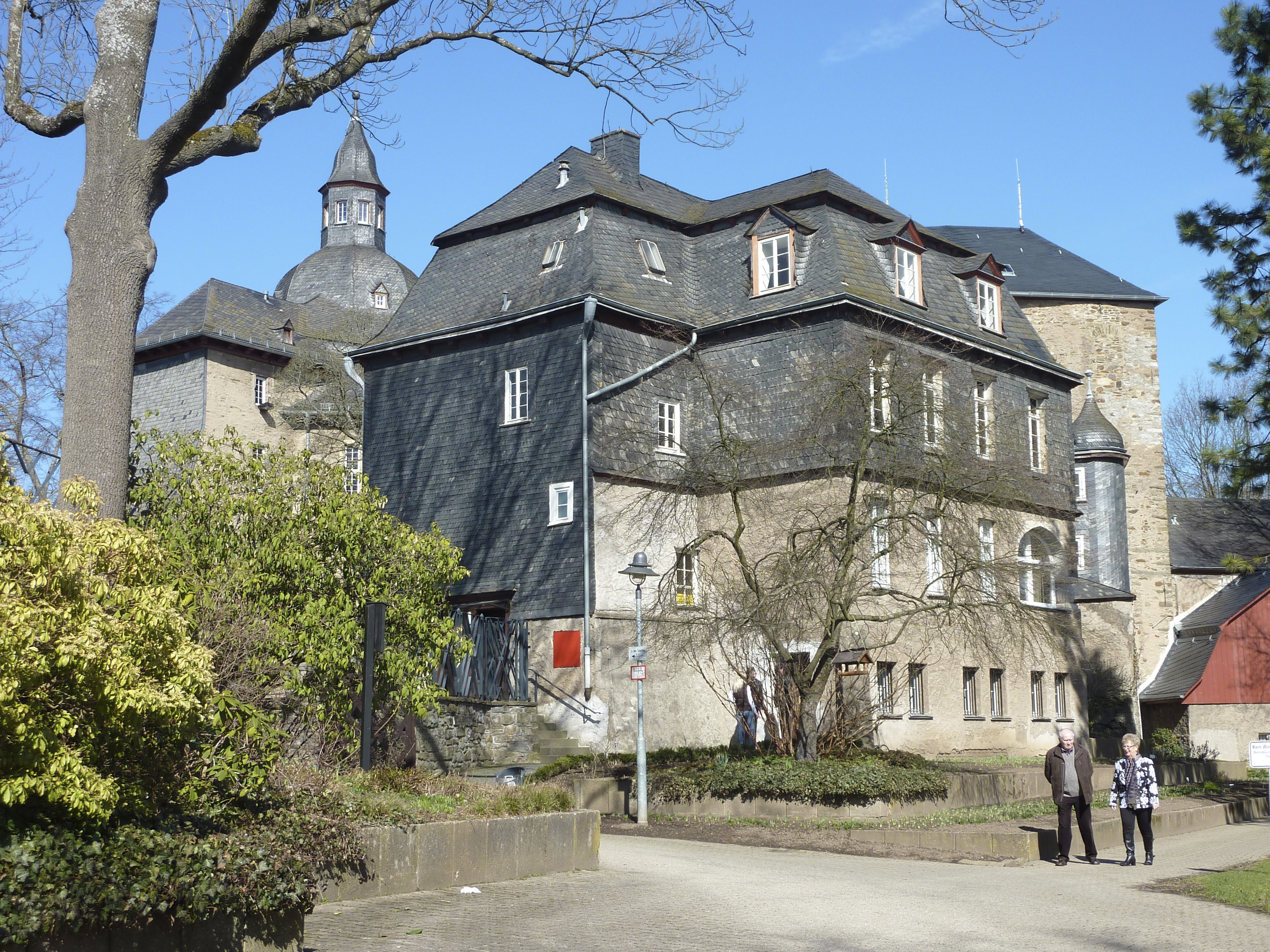
View of the Kernburg from the Schlosspark to the southeast.

The complex is first mentioned in a document dated 2nd September 1259 in the name of Bishop Henry of Liège as burch inde der stad zen Sigin. Another document from 1261 suggests that the castle had existed since at least 1224 - at the time when Henry II, Count of Nassau and Archbishop Engelbert II of Berg divided the city of Siegen between them. The castle is believed to have been built around 1200. The first documented mentions give no clues as to the castle's size or structure. One from 1341 merely mentions the "vestin Sigin, Ginsberg unde der Han". The first surviving precise evidence of the division of the building that had existed since 1224 and of the buildings' nature is a 1343 contract. This mentions two gates, the main touwer and an inner courtyard with a fountain, all jointly owned by the Count and Archbishop. The buildings facing the River Sieg were the archbishop's residence or "Bischofshaus", while the buildings facing the River Weiß were the count's residence or "Grafenhaus". Over time the archbishop's influence gradually diminished. Until the late 15th century documents referred to the complex as a castle ("burch"), a fortress ("vestin") or a "castrum" - only after that date was it commonly referred to as a "Schloss" or palace. From 1670 onwards the complex was known as the Altes Schloss (Old Palace) or Oberes Schloss (Upper Palace).

== Use since the 19th century ==
=== Siegerlandmuseum ===
In 1888 the city of Siegen bought the Obere Schloss from the Kingdom of Prussia for 30,400 marks and established the Siegerlandmuseum of regional history there in 1905. It was inaugurated on 25 March 1905. Its mission was stated to be to "present the essence of the Siegerland homeland in terms of history, culture and folklore". It had only three exhibition rooms in the Schloss, but this had been expanded to 35 rooms by 1929 and it now has 1.500 m² of display space. On 8 July (Note: Westphalia Day) 1938, a 150-metre-long 14-metre-deep show mine opened under the castle courtyard to demonstrate the original facilities and equipment of a Siegerland mine.

The exhibition rooms house, among other things, one of the most important collections of portraits of members of the House of Nassau and House of Orange. The Rubens Hall houses nine works by Peter Paul Rubens, including the loaned The Rape of the Daughters of Leucippus, an oil sketch for his Ecce Homo and the first of his treatments of The Descent from the Cross. One of the most important rooms in the museum is the 14th century Gothic Hall with its original greywacke herringbone pavement. Other rooms are dedicated to famous people from Siegerland, such as the writer and doctor Johann Heinrich Jung-Stilling and the musical Busch brothers.

The museum also hosts temporary exhibitions. Since 1981 the town of Siegen has been its sole sponsor. It has been managed since 1991 by Ursula Blanchebarbe her predecessors have included Wilhelm Weyer (1946-1949) and Bernd Roedia. The Schloss also houses the city's research library.

== Bibliography (in German) ==
- Ursula Blanchebarbe: Kleine Geschichte des Oberen Schlosses in Siegen. Siegen 2005
- Ursula Blanchebarbe: Aus dem Bestand des Siegerlandmuseums im Oberen Schloss / Siegerlandmuseum im Oberen Schloss mit Ausstellungsforum Haus Oranienstraße. Siegen, Siegerlandmuseum 2010.
- Ferdinand G. B. Fischer: 100 Burgen zwischen den 1000 Bergen. Das grosse Burgen- und Schlösserbuch für Südwestfalen. Fotos von Toni Anneser. Gronenberg, Wiehl 1996, ISBN 3-88265-198-9, S. 148 f.
- Jens Friedhoff: Sauerland und Siegerland. 70 Burgen und Schlösser. Stuttgart 2002, ISBN 3-8062-1706-8, S. 136–139.
- Wilhelm Güthling (ed.): Geschichte der Stadt Siegen im Abriss. Vorländer, Siegen 1955.
- Wilhelm Güthling: 700 Jahre Burg und Stadt Siegen. In: Siegerland – Blätter des Siegerländer Heimatvereins e. V. Band 36, Heft 2, Vorländer, Siegen 1959, S. 37–42.
- August Kracht: Burgen und Schlösser im Sauerland, Siegerland, Hellweg, Industriegebiet. Frankfurt 1976, S. 13–26
- Gerhard Scholl: Von Burgen und Schlössern im Siegerland. In: Siegerland zwischen gestern und morgen. Vorländer, Siegen 1965, S. 25–41.
- Wilhelm Weyer: Das Obere Schloss zu Siegen. In: Siegerland. 27 (1950), H. 3, S. 81–93.
