= The Descent from the Cross (Rubens, 1618) =

Painting by Peter Paul Rubens (Hermitage, ГЭ-471)

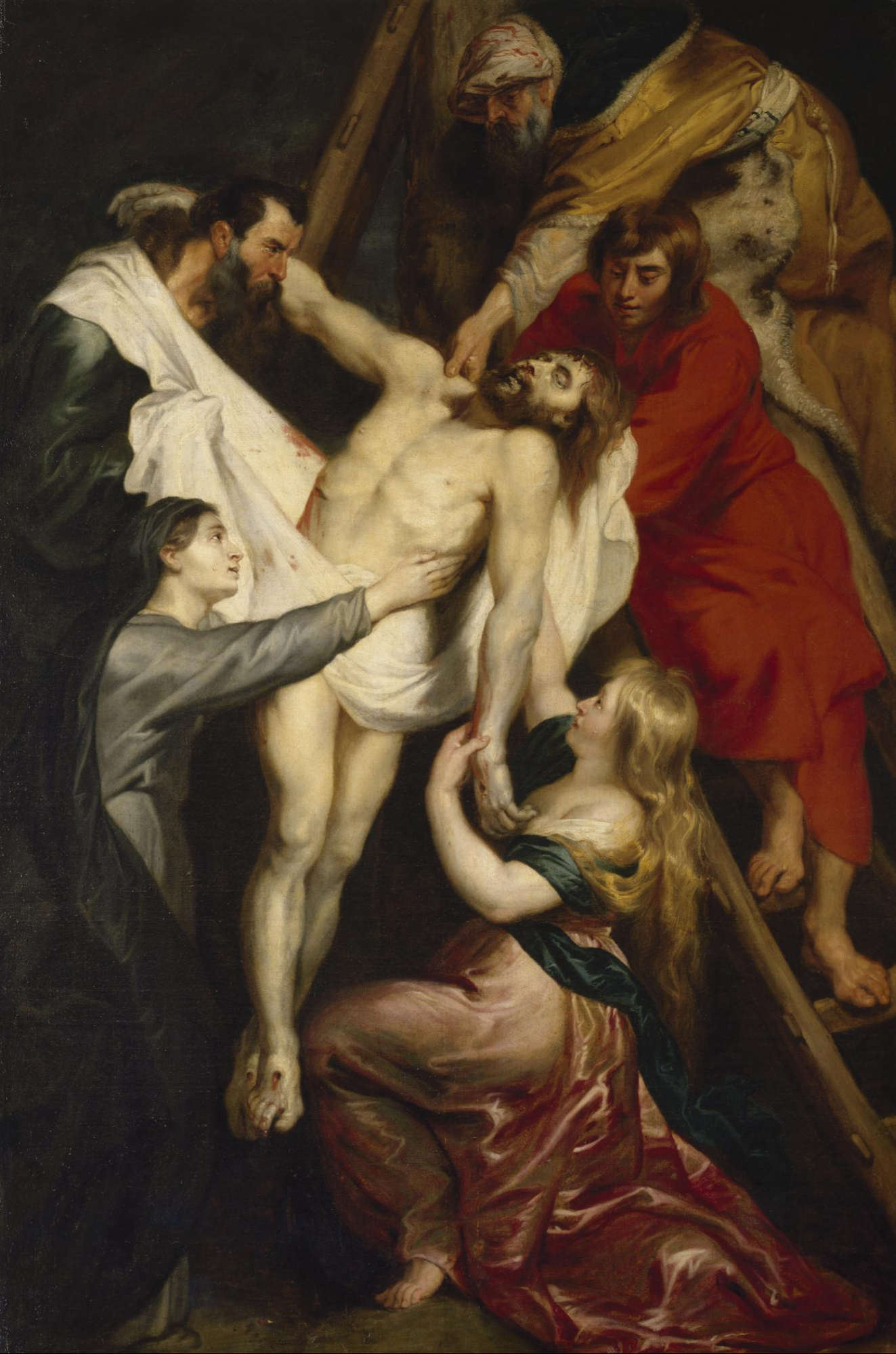
- Artist: Peter Paul Rubens
- Year: 1618
- Medium: Oil on canvas
- Location: Hermitage Museum; Saint Petersburg

The Descent from the Cross is a c.1618 oil on canvas painting by Peter Paul Rubens and his studio. The broad free brushstrokes of the old man's body and robes point to Rubens' pupil Anthony van Dyck. It is now in the Hermitage Museum in St Petersburg.

The work was commissioned for the high altar of the Capuchin church in Lier near Antwerp and based on his successful earlier work on the subject for Antwerp Cathedral. Two preparatory drawings for it survive, one each in the EV Thaw collection in New York (previously in the Wrangham collection in the United Kingdom) and the Museum of Fine Arts, Boston. It hung in the chapel until 1794, when it was hidden from the French invaders by the monks. It was next recorded as being given by Bruges to Josephine Beauharnais's collection at Château de Malmaison. It and the rest of her collection were bought in 1814 for the Hermitage.

== See also ==
- The Descent from the Cross (Rubens), for other paintings by Rubens of the same title
