= The Descent from the Cross (Rubens, 1617) =

Painting by Peter Paul Rubens, Palais des Beaux-Arts de Lille

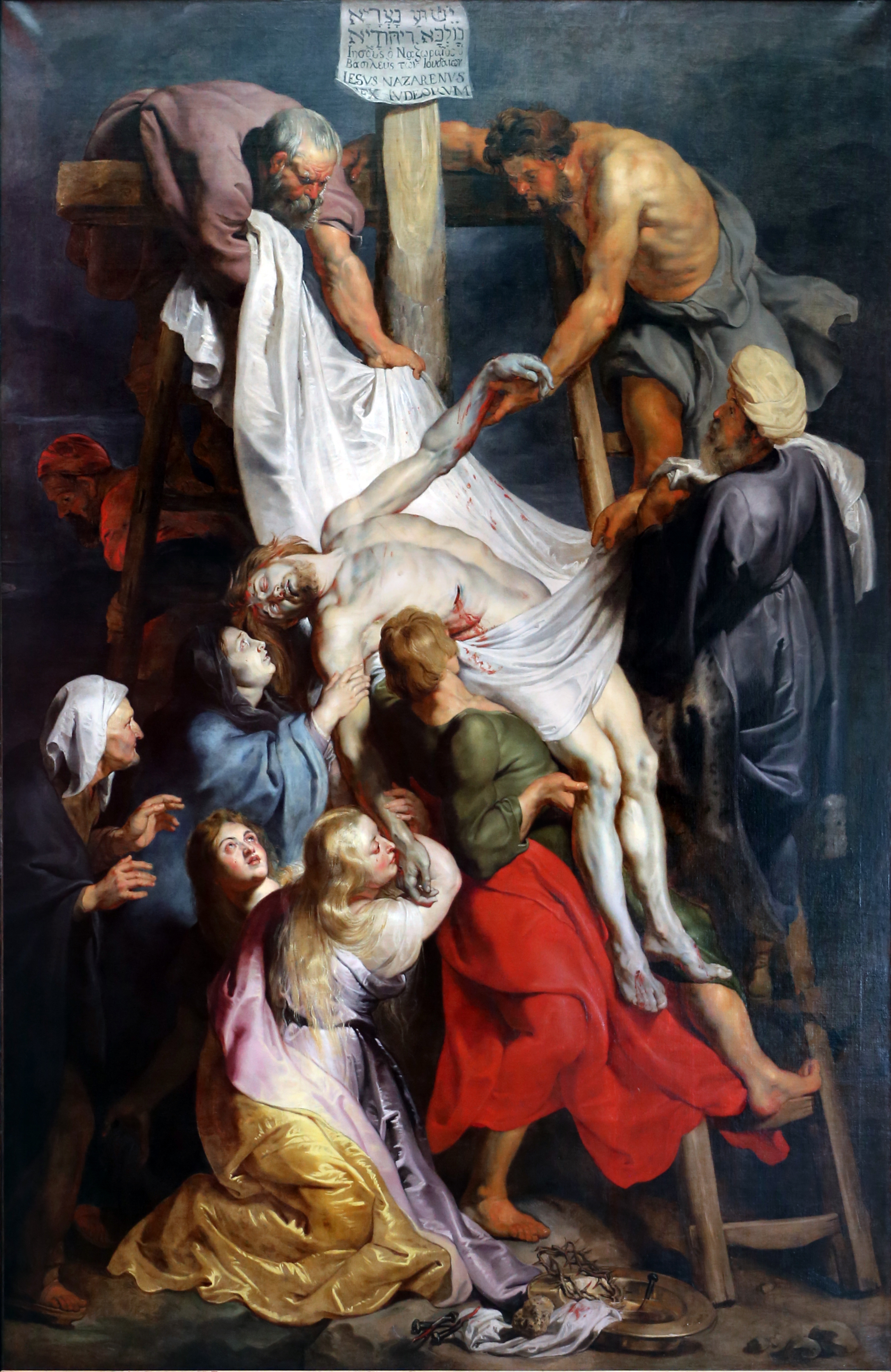
The Descent from the Cross (1616-1617) by Rubens

The Descent from the Cross is a painting by Peter Paul Rubens, executed around 1616–1617 for the chapel of the Capuchin convent in Lille, France. It was seized by France and was part of the founding collection of the Palais des Beaux-Arts de Lille, where it is still housed.

== See also ==
- The Descent from the Cross (Rubens), for other paintings by Rubens of the same title
