= Barbara Schock-Werner =

German architect

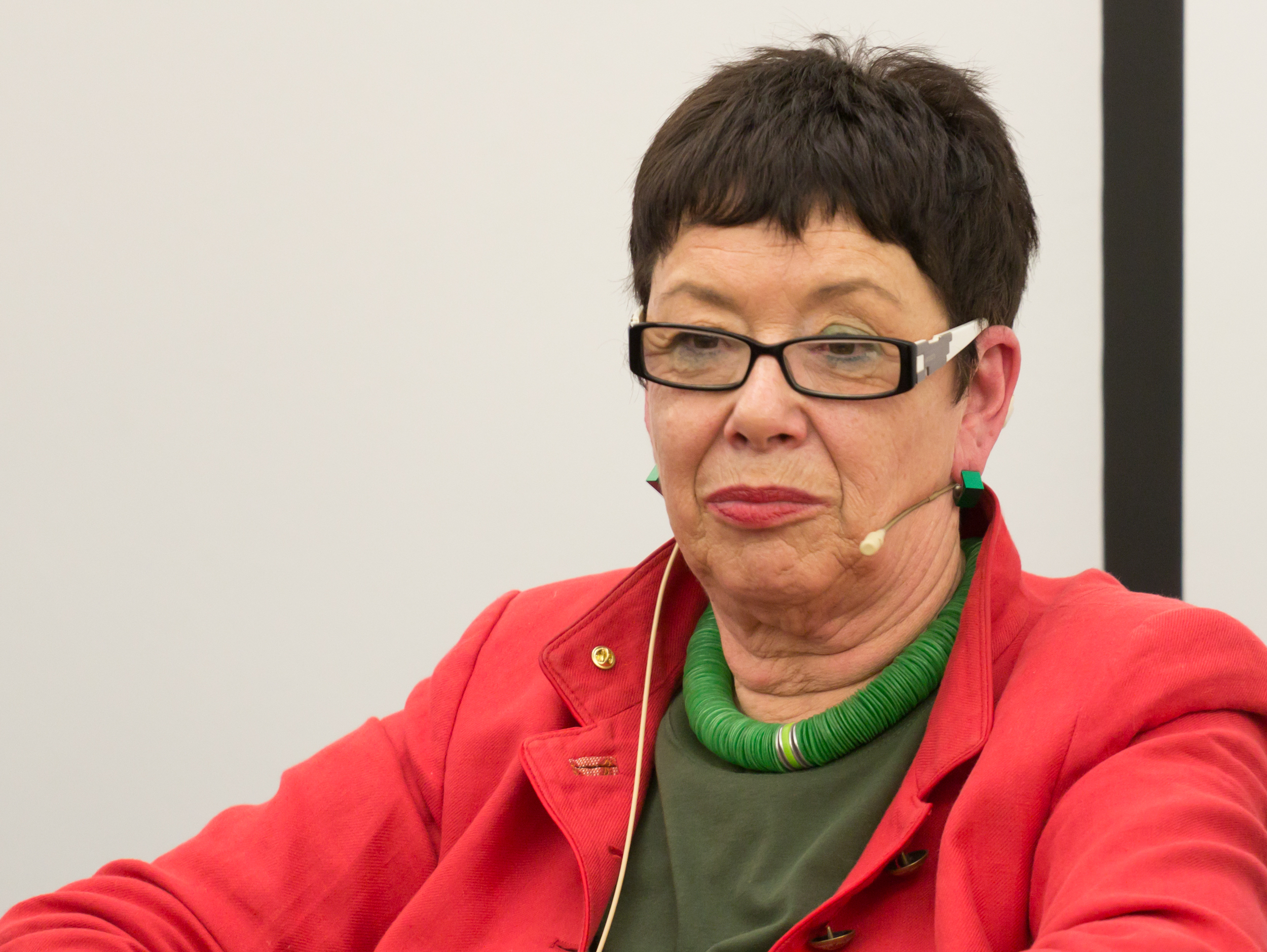
- Born: July 23, 1947 (age 79); Ludwigsburg
- Occupation: Architect

Barbara Schock-Werner (born 23 July 1947, Ludwigsburg) is a German architect, and was until her retirement end of August 2012 the master builder at Cologne Cathedral with overall responsibility for conservation and restoration work. With the official title of Dombaumeisterin (cathedral master builder), she was the first and only woman to hold the position in the cathedral's 800 years history.

== Biography ==
After an apprenticeship as a draftsman in Bad Cannstatt, Schock-Werner studied architecture at the University of Applied Sciences in Stuttgart, graduating in 1971. During her studies, she spent almost a year working with Frei Otto on the design of the roofing for the Olympic Stadium in Munich. She completed her studied at the University of Bonn in 1975. While working in an architect's office in Stuttgart on conservation work, she began to study the history of art at the University of Kiel, culminating in a dissertation on Strasbourg Cathedral in the 15th century. In 1982, she embarked on her academic career, teaching history of art and architecture at the University of Erlangen, later becoming a professor.

In January 1999, Barbara Schock-Werner became master builder at Cologne Cathedral. Part of her time was spent at the cathedral itself where she carried out inspections and instructed the painters, electricians, carpenters and bricklayers. Her annual budget ran to over six million euros. In addition to normal conservation and restoration work, she managed a number of larger projects including the porches for the western doors, the new window on the south facade designed by Gerhard Richter, as well as interior lighting and sound facilities. Another important addition was the entrance building for the tower steps and the archaeology area. She retired at the end of August 2012, at the age of 65.

Schock-Werner has also had other responsibilities. She chairs the International Association of Master Cathedral Builders as well as the European Association of Master Crafts and Design, and serves on the board of the German Castles Association. She also continues to lecture at the University of Bonn where she is an honorary professor.
