= Old Castle (Koblenz) =

Castle in Koblenz, Germany

- Alte Burg
- Koblenz
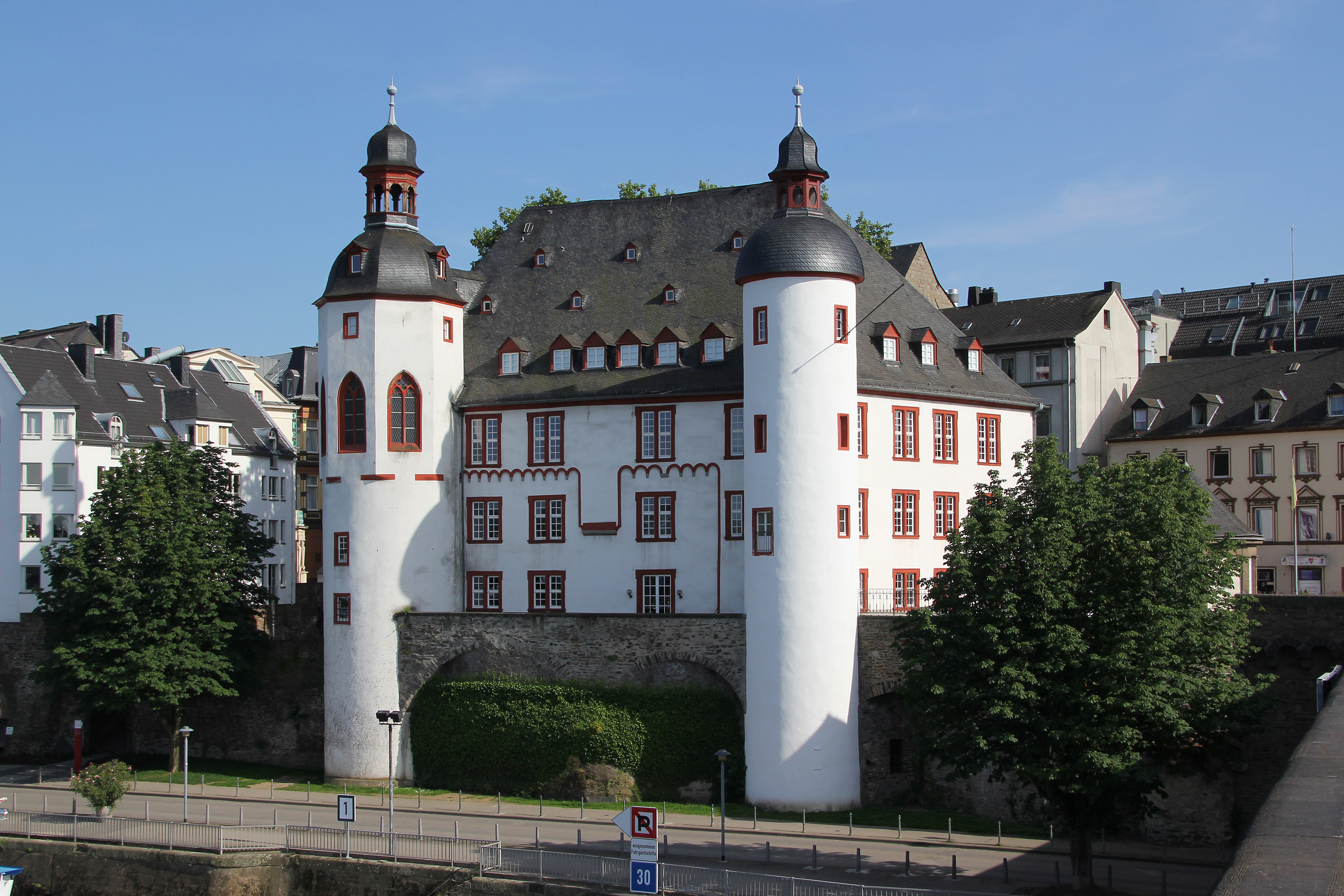
- The Burghaus of the Old Castle (remaining part), from the Baldwin Bridge.

Site information
- Type: lowland castle and settlement
- Code: DE-RP
- Condition: preserved or largely preserved

Location
- Location within Rhineland-Palatinate Location within Germany
- Coordinates: 50°21′44″N 7°35′39″E

Site history
- Built: around 1185

Garrison information
- Occupants: Archbishop of Trier

The Old Castle (German: Alte Burg) was a former Elector-owned, substantial water castle in the German city of Koblenz, incepted in the 13th century. It is today reduced to the later Burghaus (castle house); which houses the city archives. It sits on tall foundations and has a tall, black slate roof with further floors in the attic and two small cupolas. The lowland castle abutted the remaining building in the old town quarter. The castle house stands tall, next to the Moselle's right-bank towpath downstream of the strategic Baldwin Bridge (lowest crossing of the river) built in 1342. The bridge, much-repaired, remains intact.

== History ==
Around 1185, the family of von der Arken built a Romanesque residence on the site of the present castle, incorporating the remains of a Roman round tower. Koblenz's city walls, which at that time still corresponded to those of the Late Roman castellum, were extended in 1250. The first record of a Koblenz city council in 1276 was about the citizens' aspirations for more independence. So in 1276 Archbishop Henry II of Finstingen had the Old Castle built as a type of coercion castle out of the structure of the residential building to counter these moves towards greater independence. The castle was partly built on the ruins of the Late Roman city wall dating to the 4th century. From 1281, however, the citizens of Koblenz prevented any further work on the ramparts and castle. Henry II of Finstingen was thus forced to subdue the city and, in 1283, retaliated with armed force. Archbishop Diether of Nassau subjugated the city permanently in 1304 after fierce fighting and Koblenz was forced to dissolve its city council. The construction of the Old Castle was completed in 1307. It was originally surrounded by a broad, water-filled moat and an enceinte.

Next to the castle, under Archbishop Baldwin of Luxemburg, construction of the Baldwin Bridge over the Moselle began in 1342. Archbishop Otto von Ziegenhain included the castle in the strong new fortifications of the city with the construction of the western round tower and the bridge gate to the Balduin Bridge. Over the centuries the castle was rebuilt and expanded several times, especially under the Archbishops Baldwin of Luxembourg, Otto von Ziegenhain and Richard von Greiffenklau zu Vollrads. The later Electors of Trier also occasionally used the castle, but it was let out from the early 18th century. From 1779 its fortifications were gradually dismantled. The last resident in the Electoral era was Baron Hugo von Kesselstatt.

Under French rule, the castle became state property and was sold to private individuals. In 1806 a sheet metal factory moved into the building, and an extension was built on the city side for the factory operation. In 1897 the factory closed and the castle was sold to the city of Koblenz. Between 1898 and 1900, extensive renovation work was carried out under the direction of the city's chief architect Friedrich Wilhelm Ludwin Mäckler. The annex was removed from the time of the factory use and the lanterns on the tower roofs were reconstructed. From 1899 to 1923 it was the seat of the Stadtsparkasse Koblenz, later of the municipal welfare office. From 1938 on, the Hitler Youth area management used the castle. It suffered only minor damage in World War II and was completely renovated between 1960 and 1962. The baroque stucco ceilings that had been preserved on the third floor were removed.

After the renovation, the Old Castle was used by the city library. From 1980, the library shared the building with the city archive. After the completion of the "Forum Confluentes" in 2013, the library moved into the new cultural building on the Zentralplatz, since when the city archive has been the sole user of the castle.

== Gallery ==
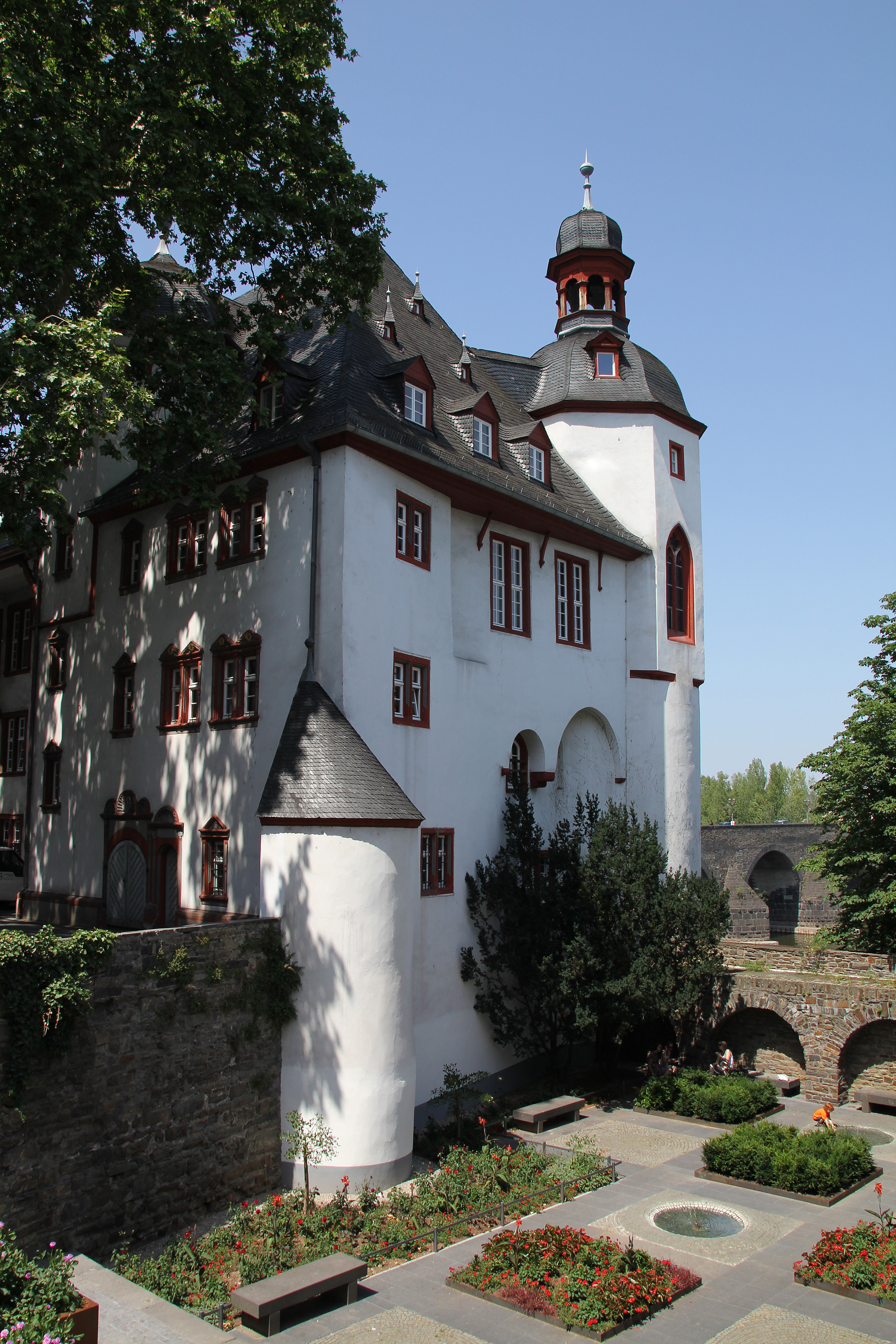
Eastern view of the Old Castle

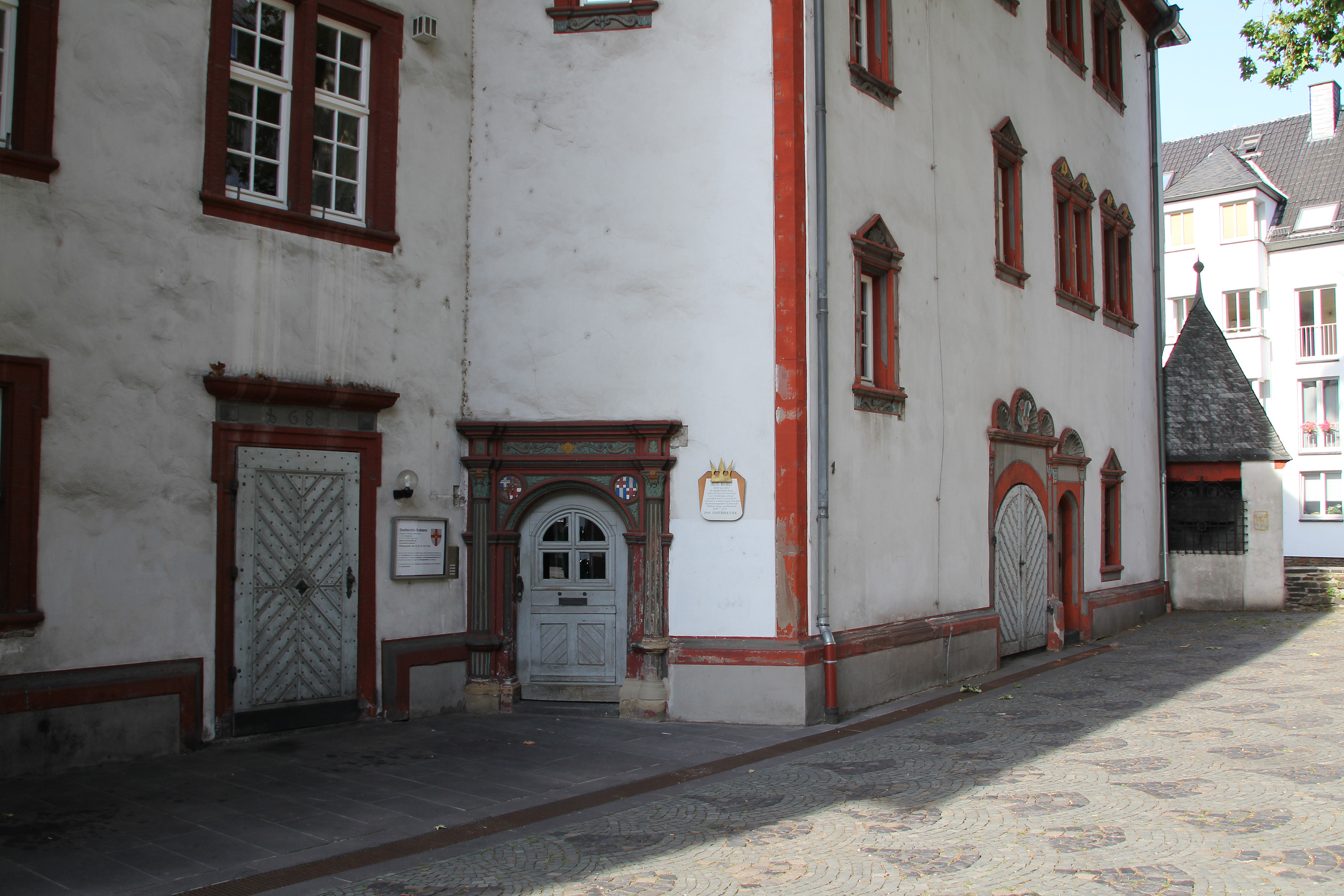
Main entrance in the Renaissance style

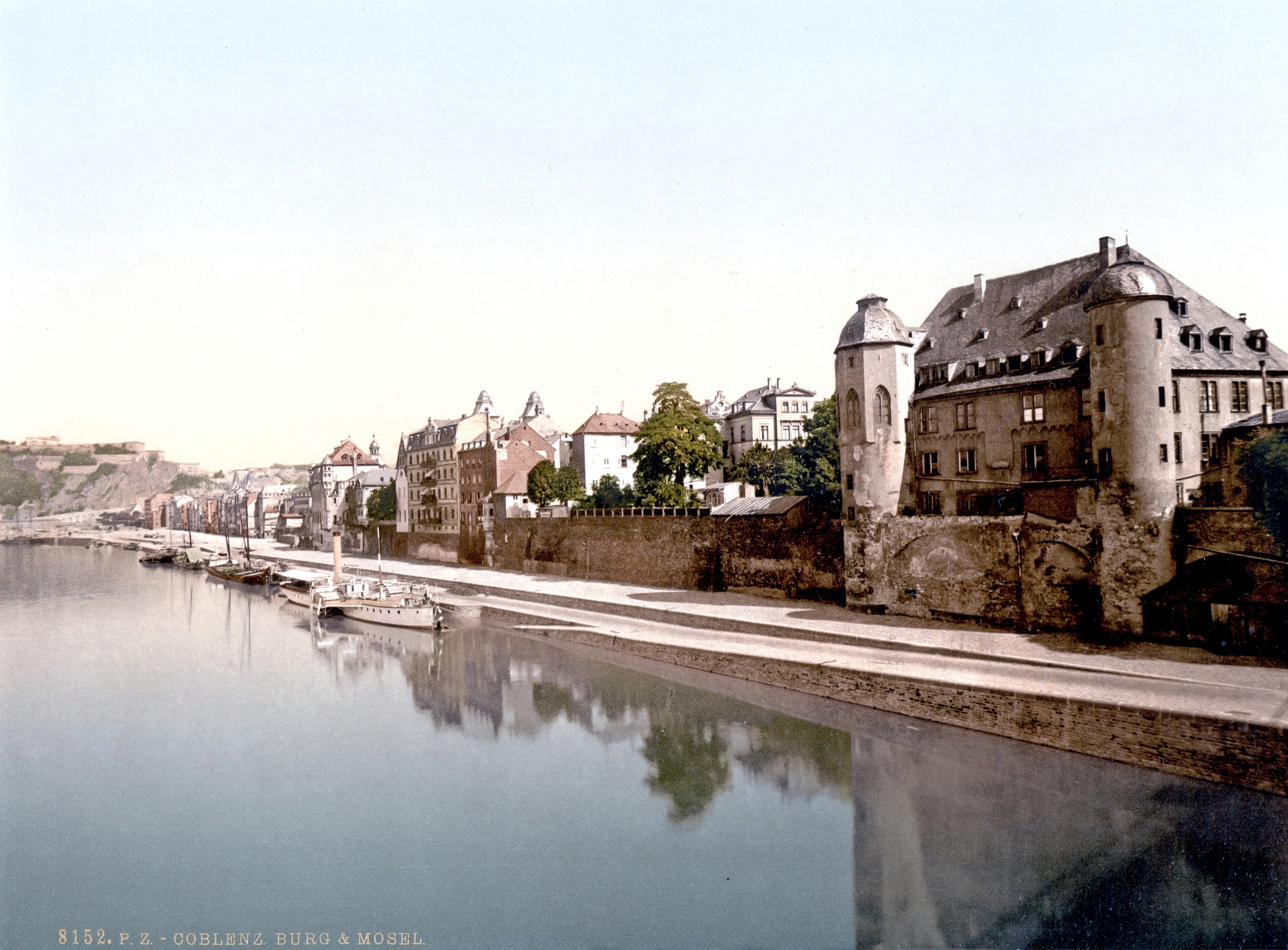
The Old Castle around 1890

== Literature ==
- Energieversorgung Mittelrhein GmbH (publ.): Geschichte der Stadt Koblenz. Gesamtredaktion: Ingrid Bátori in Verbindung mit Dieter Kerber und Hans Josef Schmidt
  - Vol. 1: Von den Anfängen bis zum Ende der kurfürstlichen Zeit. Theiss, Stuttgart, 1992. ISBN 3-8062-0876-X
  - Vol. 2: Von der französischen Stadt bis zur Gegenwart. Theiss, Stuttgart, 1993. ISBN 3-8062-1036-5
- Fritz Michel: Die Kunstdenkmäler der Stadt Koblenz. Die profanen Denkmäler und die Vororte, Munich, Berlin, 1954, pp. 176–180 (Die Kunstdenkmäler von Rheinland-Pfalz Erster Band).
- Kulturdenkmäler in Rheinland-Pfalz Band 3.2. Stadt Koblenz. Innenstadt, revised by Herbert Dellwing and Reinhard Kallenbach, Speyer, 2004, pp. 90f. ISBN 3-88462-198-X
- Udo Liessm: Die "Alte Burg" in Koblenz. In: Burgen und Schlösser, 16. Jg 1975, pp. 21-33
- Erich Keyser (ed.): Städtebuch Rheinland-Pfalz und Saarland. (Reihe: Deutsches Städtebuch. Handbuch städtischer Geschichte. IV Südwestdeutschland, 5th part) Im Auftrage der Arbeitsgemeinschaft der historischen Kommissionen und mit Unterstützung des Deutschen Städtetages, des Deutschen Städtebundes und des Deutschen Gemeindetages, Stuttgart 1964
- Landesamt für Denkmalpflege Rheinland-Pfalz (publ.): Die Kunstdenkmäler der Stadt Koblenz. Die profanen denkmäler und die Vororte (Series: Die Kunstdenkmäler von Rheinland-Pfalz), unedited reprint of the 1954 edition, Im Auftrage des Kultusministeriums von Rheinland-Pfalz, Deutscher Kunstverlag München-Berlin, 1986 ISBN 3-422-00563-3
- Ingeborg Scholz: Erzbischof Balduin von Luxemburg (1307–1354) als Bauherr von Landesburgen im Erzstift Trier. Diss. phil. Marburg 2003, Münster 2004 (Architektur 2), pp. 35-39. - ISBN 3-8258-7350-1
