= Herbert Dellwing =

German art historian

Herbert Dellwing (1940 – 31 December 2010) was a German art historian and historic preservationist. He lived and work in Speyer and Neustadt an der Weinstraße.

== Life and career ==
Born in Großauheim, Dellwing studied art history from 1960 at the Kunstgeschichtlichen Institut of the Goethe University Frankfurt. From 1964 to 1974, he did research in Italy (Venice, Florence). In 1967, he received his doctorate in art history with a thesis on the architecture of the mendicant orders in the Veneto at the University of Frankfurt. Since 1975, he worked as a curator at the Landesamt für Denkmalpflege Rheinland-Pfalz in Speyer and Mainz.

In 1979, he habilitated and began teaching at the University of Frankfurt. From 1983 he taught art history at the University of Mainz, and since 1987 at the Saarland University in Saarbrücken. Since 1991, he taught as an associate professor of art history at the Kunstgeschichtliches Institut der Universität Frankfurt.

From 1991, Dellwing was a member of the board of the Speyer Art Association and curator of exhibitions on contemporary art. Dellwing built up a collection on German Informel since 1948.

Dellwing died on 31 December 2010, in Speyer.

== Publications ==
Monographs

- Studien zur Baukunst der Bettelorden im Veneto. Die Gotik der monumentalen Gewölbebasiliken. Deutscher Kunstverlag, München 1970
- with Reinhardt Hootz: Kunstdenkmäler in Italien – Ein Bildhandbuch Venedig – Stadt und Provinz, series: Bildhandbuch der Kunstdenkmäler, München 1974, Deutscher Kunstverlag, ISBN 3-422-00340-1.
- Venetien ohne Venedig. Kunstdenkmäler in Italien. Ein Bildhandbuch. Herausgegeben von Reinhardt Hootz, Berlin 1976, Deutscher Kunstverlag, ISBN 3-422-00347-9.
- with Hans Erich Kubach: Die Kunstdenkmäler der Stadt und des ehemaligen Landkreises Zweibrücken. 2 vols., Deutscher Kunstverlag, 1981, ISBN 978-3-422-00555-6.
- Protestantische Alexanderkirche, Zweibrücken (Kleine Kunstführer Nr. 1326). Munich; Zürich 1982 Schnell und Steiner
- Kulturdenkmäler in Rheinland-Pfalz. Vol 1: Speyer. Wernersche Verlagsanstalt, Worms 1985. ISBN 3-590-31031-6
- (as collaborator): Kulturdenkmäler in Rheinland-Pfalz. Denkmaltopographie Bundesrepublik Deutschland. Vol 3.1: Stadt Koblenz. Südliche Vorstadt und Oberwerth. Schwann, Düsseldorf 1986. ISBN 3-590-31033-2
- with Edith Ruser: Kulturdenkmäler in Rheinland-Pfalz. Denkmaltopographie Bundesrepublik Deutschland. Vol. 5.1: Kreis Bad Kreuznach. Stadt Bad Kreuznach. Schwann, Düsseldorf 1987. ISBN 3-491-31035-0.
- Kulturdenkmäler in Rheinland-Pfalz Vol 1: Stadt Speyer, Düsseldorf 1988, Schwann, ISBN 3-590-31031-6.
- with Rolf Mertzenich: Kulturdenkmäler in Rheinland-Pfalz. Denkmaltopographie Bundesrepublik Deutschland. Vol. 7: Kreis Ludwigshafen. Werner, Worms 1989. ISBN 3-491-31038-5.
- Die Kirchenbaukunst des späten Mittelalters in Venetien. Worms 1990, Wernersche Verlagsgesellschaft, ISBN 3-88462-070-3.
- Dresden, Halle, Leipzig. Kunstzentren der 80er Jahre in Europa, 20 June – 28 July 1991 Kunstverein Speyer, 20 June – 28 July 1991 Kunstverein Ludwigshafen, 21 June – 28 July 1991 Rathaus-Foyer Main, Speyer 1991, ISBN 3-87439-239-2.
- (as collaborator.): Collage in Deutschland 1950-1993. Kunstverein Speyer 174, 1993
- Herbert Dellwing, Wolfhard Viertel (catalogue): Zhou Brothers, Speyer, Kunstverein, 1997, ISBN 3-925521-35-6.
- with Wolfgang Brönner, Paul-Georg Custodis, Wolfgang Franz, Klaus Häfner, Dieter Kastner, Franz Ronig, Barbara Schock-Werner, Arnold Wolff: Die Apollinariskirche in Remagen. Wernersche Verlagsges 2005, ISBN 3-88462-201-3.
- with Reinhard Kallenbach: Kulturdenkmäler in Rheinland-Pfalz. Denkmaltopographie Bundesrepublik Deutschland. Vol. 3.2: Stadt Koblenz. Innenstadt. Werner, Worms 2004. ISBN 3-88462-198-X.
- with Franz Dudenhöffer; Peter Eichhorn; Clemens Jöckle; Eckard Schulz; Eva-Maria Urban; Cornelia Vagt-Beck; Jürgen Vorderstemann: 40 Jahre Kunstverein Speyer 1968–2008, Speyer 2008, Pilger Verlag

Important essays on monuments

- Der Santo in Padua – Eine baugeschichtliche Untersuchung. In Mitteilungen des Kunsthistorischen Institutes in Florenz 19, 1975, pp. 198–306.
- Die Kirchen San Zaccaria in Venedig. Eine ikonologische Studie. In Zeitschrift für Kunstgeschichte 37, 1974, pp. 224–234.

Editorship

- BILD-RAUM, RAUM-BILD. Ausstellungskatalog Kunstverein Speyer 2000
- Friedemann Hahn. Übers Meer, text by Herbert Dellwing, Gedichte von Friedemann Hahn, Edition Nord/West 2002, ISBN 3-926265-47-7
- Michael Croissant und seine Schüler. Catalogue of the exhibition at the Kulturhof Flachsgasse from 28 September to 26 October 2008.
