= Baldwin Bridge =

Baldwin Bridge may refer to:

- Raymond E. Baldwin Bridge, Connecticut, US
- Baldwin Bridge, Koblenz, Germany
