= Günther Binding =

German art historian

Günther Binding (born 6 March 1936) is a German art historian and retired professor of art history and urban conservation at the University of Cologne.

== Life ==
Born in Koblenz, Binding, brother of the later sculptor Wolfgang Binding and uncle of the painter Stephanie Binding, attended primary schools in Hildesheim and Arnsberg and graduated from Apostelgymnasium in Cologne in 1955 with his Abitur. After three semesters of art history at the University of Cologne, he studied architecture at the TH Aachen and later art history, history, archaeology in Bonn. In 1959, he was accepted into the Studienstiftung des deutschen Volkes programme for gifted students. After graduating in 1960, he received his doctorate in 1962 under Willy Weyres; his dissertation was on the subject of Münzenberg Castle in the Wetterau. In 1963, he received his doctorate under Herbert von Einem in Bonn with the thesis The Palatinate of Emperor Friedrich Barbarossa in Gelnhausen and Early Baptist Architecture in the Rhine-Main Region. In the meantime, he worked as an architect, first with Wilhelm Riphahn at the time of his construction of the Wi-So wing of Cologne University. Freelance work followed until 1964: residential buildings, excavations and restorations in Hesse.

From 1964 to 1970, Binding directed excavations of the Rheinisches Landesmuseum Bonn as head of the Lower Rhine district office. 1966-1969 Lectureship in building research at the University of Cologne. In 1969 Habilitation at the University of Cologne with the Habilitation thesis Burg und Stift Elten am Niederrhein and was appointed Akademischer Rat and professor there in 1970. From 1974, he was full professor of art history and urban conservation, director of the Institute of Art History with the Department of Architectural History.

In his main field of research, the architectural history of the Middle Ages, the standardisation of technical language is his particular concern. His work Architektonische Formenlehre, published in 1980, is a standard work on architectural description.

At the University of Cologne, he held the office of Dean of the Faculty of Humanities from 1979 to 1981 and that of Rector from 1981 to 1983, followed by the then customary period as Prorector. From 1982 to 1984, he was Vice-President of the German Rectors' Conference.

In 2007, Binding was appointed by Cologne to the Scientific Advisory Board on the Archaeological Zone Cologne. In a dispute with the project manager Sven Schütte, Binding resigned again in March 2008.

Since 1999 he has been a corresponding member of the Saxon Academy of Sciences at Leipzig, since 2002 a corresponding and 2005 a full member of the scientific society at the Goethe University Frankfurt.

Binding has been emeritus since 31 March 2001.

== Awards ==
- 1966: Ruhrpreis für Kunst und Wissenschaft of Mülheim an der Ruhr
- 1986: Josef Humar Prize of the Haus und Grund
- 1987: Rheinlandtaler of the Landschaftsverbandes Rheinland
- 1986: Kalinowski-Medaille des Generaldirektors der polnischen Werkstätten für Denkmalpflege (PKZ)

== Works (selection) ==
- with Udo Mainzer, Anita Wiedenau: Kleine Kunstgeschichte des deutschen Fachwerkbaus. Wissenschaftliche Buchgesellschaft, Darmstadt 1975, ISBN 3-534-06900-5.
- with Barbara Löhr: Kleine Kölner Baugeschichte. Bachem, Cologne 1976, ISBN 3-7616-0313-4.
- Architektonische Formenlehre. Wissenschaftliche Buchgesellschaft, Darmstadt 1980, 6th edition 2012, ISBN 978-3-534-25535-1.
- with Barbara Kahle: 2000 Jahre Baukunst in Köln. Bachem, Köln 1983, ISBN 3-7616-0672-9.
- with Matthias Untermann: Kleine Kunstgeschichte der mittelalterlichen Ordensbaukunst in Deutschland. Wissenschaftliche Buchgesellschaft, Darmstadt 1985, ISBN 3-534-08012-2.
- Maßwerk. Wissenschaftliche Buchgesellschaft, Darmstadt 1989, ISBN 3-534-01582-7.
- Das Dachwerk auf Kirchen im deutschen Sprachraum. Vom Mittelalter bis zum 18. Jahrhundert. Deutscher Kunstverlag, Munich 1991, ISBN 3-422-06068-5.
- Baubetrieb im Mittelalter. Wissenschaftliche Buchgesellschaft, Darmstadt 1993, ISBN 3-534-10908-2.
- Deutsche Königspfalzen. Von Karl dem Großen bis Friedrich II. (765–1240). Wissenschaftliche Buchgesellschaft, Darmstadt 1996, ISBN 3-89678-016-6.
- Der früh- und hochmittelalterliche Bauherr als sapiens architectus. Wissenschaftliche Buchgesellschaft, Darmstadt 2nd edition 1998, ISBN 3-534-14248-9.
- with Andreas Speer (Hrsg.): Abt Suger von Saint-Denis, Ausgewählte Schriften. Wissenschaftliche Buchgesellschaft, Darmstadt 2000, ISBN 3-534-11320-9.
- with Susanne Linscheid-Burdich: Planen und Bauen im frühen und hohen Mittelalter. Wissenschaftliche Buchgesellschaft, Darmstadt 2001, ISBN 3-534-15489-4.
- Meister der Baukunst. Geschichte des Architekten- und Ingenieurberufes. Primus, Darmstadt 2004, ISBN 3-89678-497-8.
- Wanderung von Werkmeistern und Handwerkern im frühen und hohen Mittelalter. Unter besonderer Berücksichtigung des Rhein-Main-Gebietes (Sitzungsberichte der Wissenschaftlichen Gesellschaft an der Johann-Wolfgang-Goethe-Universität Frankfurt am Main. Vol. 43, No. 1). Steiner, Stuttgart 2005, ISBN 3-515-08669-2.
- Als die Kathedralen in den Himmel wuchsen. Bauen im Mittelalter. Primus, Darmstadt 2006, ISBN 3-89678-283-5.
- Antike Säulen als Spolien in früh- und hochmittelalterlichen Kirchen und Pfalzen: Materialspolie oder Bedeutungsträger? (Sitzungsberichte der Wissenschaftlichen Gesellschaft an der Johann-Wolfgang-Goethe-Universität Frankfurt am Main. Vol. 45, No. 1). Steiner Stuttgart 2007, ISBN 978-3-515-08999-9.
- Methoden und Probleme bei der Datierung von mittelalterlichen Bauwerken (Sitzungsberichte der Wissenschaftlichen Gesellschaft an der Johann-Wolfgang-Goethe-Universität Frankfurt am Main. Vol. 47, No. 3). Steiner, Wiesbaden 2009, ISBN 978-3-515-09607-2.
- Die Michaeliskirche in Hildesheim und Bischof Bernward als sapiens architectus. Wissenschaftliche Buchgesellschaft, Darmstadt 2013, ISBN 978-3-534-25799-7.
