= Comité International d'Histoire de l'Art =

The Comité International d'Histoire de l'Art (CIHA) is an international committee that endeavors to improve art historical research.

It was founded in Vienna in 1873 in order to develop the historical and methodological study of artistic activities and productions; to ensure permanent links between art historians of all countries; to improve methods of art historical teaching and research; and to increase the research resources available to art historians, i.e. data bases, bibliographies, photographic and iconographical documentation. It stimulates international meetings of art historians and co-ordinates the dissemination of information about research undertaken under the aegis of the committee. Its conferences, publications and research projects disseminate information and publicity about art historical activities world-wide.

The CIHA is currently directed by Professor LaoZhu from Peking University in China. Former director is Georg Ulrich Großmann, director of the Germanisches Nationalmuseum. Former members of the board included Millard Meiss, Herbert von Einem, Jan Gerrit Van Gelder, Mario Salmi, André Chastel, Jacques Thuillier, Jan Białostocki and many other well-known art historians.

Every four years, the Comité International d'Histoire de l'Art holds a major Congress. The thirty-fourth Congress in the History of Art, organized by CIHA members, took place in Beijing, China, in September 2016.

The National Committee for the History of Art (NCHA) is the U.S. affiliate of the Comité International d'Histoire de l'Art.
