= Wolfgang Brönner =

German art historian and historic preservationist

Wolfgang Dieter Brönner (born 17 November 1940) is a German art historian and historic preservationist. From 1991 to 2005, he was the Landeskonservator of the General Directorate for Cultural Heritage Rhineland-Palatinate in Mainz.

== Life ==
Born in Berlin, Brönner studied law at the universities of Julius-Maximilians-Universität Würzburg, the University of Lausanne and the Rheinische Friedrich-Wilhelms-Universität Bonn from 1961, before staying in Bonn in 1965 to study Art History and Classical Archaeology. In 1971, he passed the zweite juristische Staatsexamen. In the same year he was awarded a degree in art history by Heinrich Lützeler with a thesis on "French architectural theory of the 17th century" to the Dr. phil.

After graduating, he first moved to the administration of the Technische Universität Dortmund and then entered the service of the Landesamt für Denkmalpflege Bremen as a scientific officer in 1973. From there, he joined the Landesamt für Denkmalpflege Bremen as a scientific officer in 1980. Its director at the time, Udo Mainzer, entrusted Brönner with basic research on 19th and 20th century architecture after his arrival and 20th century, for which a new department within the inventory was established and thus initiated the creation of the standard work on villa architecture in Germany: Die bürgerliche Villa in Deutschland 1830 - 1900. From 1986 Brönner headed the inventory department.

One year after his habilitation in art history at the University of Bonn, Brönner resigned as senior conservator at the Rhineland Office for the Preservation of Monuments on 15 September 1991 and succeeded Magnus Backes as state conservator of Rhineland-Palatinate. A task he performed until his retirement on 29 November 2005.

In addition to his official duties, Brönner has acted as editorial director of the biannual journal Die Denkmalpflege since 1993. In 1999, he also received an appointment as associate professor at the University of Mainz. He had already held repeated teaching posts at the University of Bremen, University of Cologne, Bonn and Mainz since 1974.

In addition to other memberships in scientific advisory boards, including those for Speyer Cathedral and Mainz Cathedral Brönner was also involved in the preparations for the inclusion of the Rhine Gorge in the List of World Heritage Sites in Germany in 2002 via the State Office for the Preservation of Historical Monuments and Rhineland-Palatinate.

== Publications ==
- Blondel – Perrault. Zur Architekturtheorie des 17th Jahrhunderts in Frankreich. Dissertation, Philosophische Fakultät, Universität Bonn 1971.
- Die bürgerliche Villa in Deutschland 1830 – 1890. Unter besonderer Berücksichtigung des Rheinlandes. (Beiträge zu den Bau- und Kunstdenkmälern im Rheinland, vol.29), Patmos-Schwann, Düsseldorf 1987, ISBN 3-491-29029-5 (2nd slightly revised. ed., Wernersche Verlagsgesellschaft, Worms 1994, ISBN 3-491-29029-5
- Die Villa Cahn in Bonn-Plittersdorf. Ein "Deutsches Haus" am Rhein. Geschichte – Architektur – Ausstattung – Kunstsammlung. (Beiträge zu den Bau- und Kunstdenkmälern im Rheinland, vol.31), J.P. Bachem Verlag, Cologne 1991, ISBN 3-7616-1001-7.
- Brönner, Wolfgang; Strauss, Jürgen (2000). Bürgerliche Villen in Potsdam (in German). Potsdam: Strauss. ISBN 978-3-929748-13-0. OCLC 231870484.
- Brönner, Wolfgang (2009). Die bürgerliche Villa in Deutschland (in German). Worms: Werner. ISBN 978-3-88462-286-5.
