= Wolfgang Binding =

German sculptor and graphic artist

Wolfgang Binding (born 1937 in Munich) is a German sculptor and graphic artist.

== Biography ==
Binding was born in Munich but grew up in Cologne. After graduating from high school in 1957, he completed an apprenticeship as a sculptor and stonemason at Cologne's Dombauhütte, and then studied sculpture at the Kunstakademie Düsseldorf. Between 1959 and 1963, he was a master student of Zoltan Székessy. In 1963, a scholarship enabled him to spend two years abroad in Alexandria and Cairo. He was assistant to Elmar Hillebrand between 1965 and 1975. After habilitating in sculpture in 1973, he became a visiting professor at Northern Michigan University, and then a full professor of sculpture at RWTH Aachen University. He retired in 1993.

Binding's most notable works comprise sculptures, fountains and monuments in several cities in Germany and Switzerland. His sculptures mostly depict animals or people in natural poses. For the World Equestrian Games 2006 in Aachen, he created the large sculpture Playing Horses. A large sculpture representing a goat was bought by the Solomon R. Guggenheim Museum in New York City.

In addition to his sculptures, Binding regularly exhibits his graphics and drawings.

Binding's daughter Stephanie also studied sculpture and graphic arts. The art historian Günther Binding is Wolfgang Binding's brother.

== Selected works ==
- Heiliger Georg (St. George), Aachen, 1980
- Ponyführerin (Horse-handler), Aachen Zoo, 1983
- Spiel- und Erlebnisbrunnen (Play and adventure fountain), Bergheim, 1984
- Eselreiterin (Donkey rider), Stolberg, 1986
- Entenfänger (Duck catcher), Aachen Zoo, 1986
- Kuhjunge schiebt Kuh (Boy pushes cow), Aachen-Eilendorf, 1988
- Spielende Pferde (Playing horses), Aachen, 2006

== Gallery ==
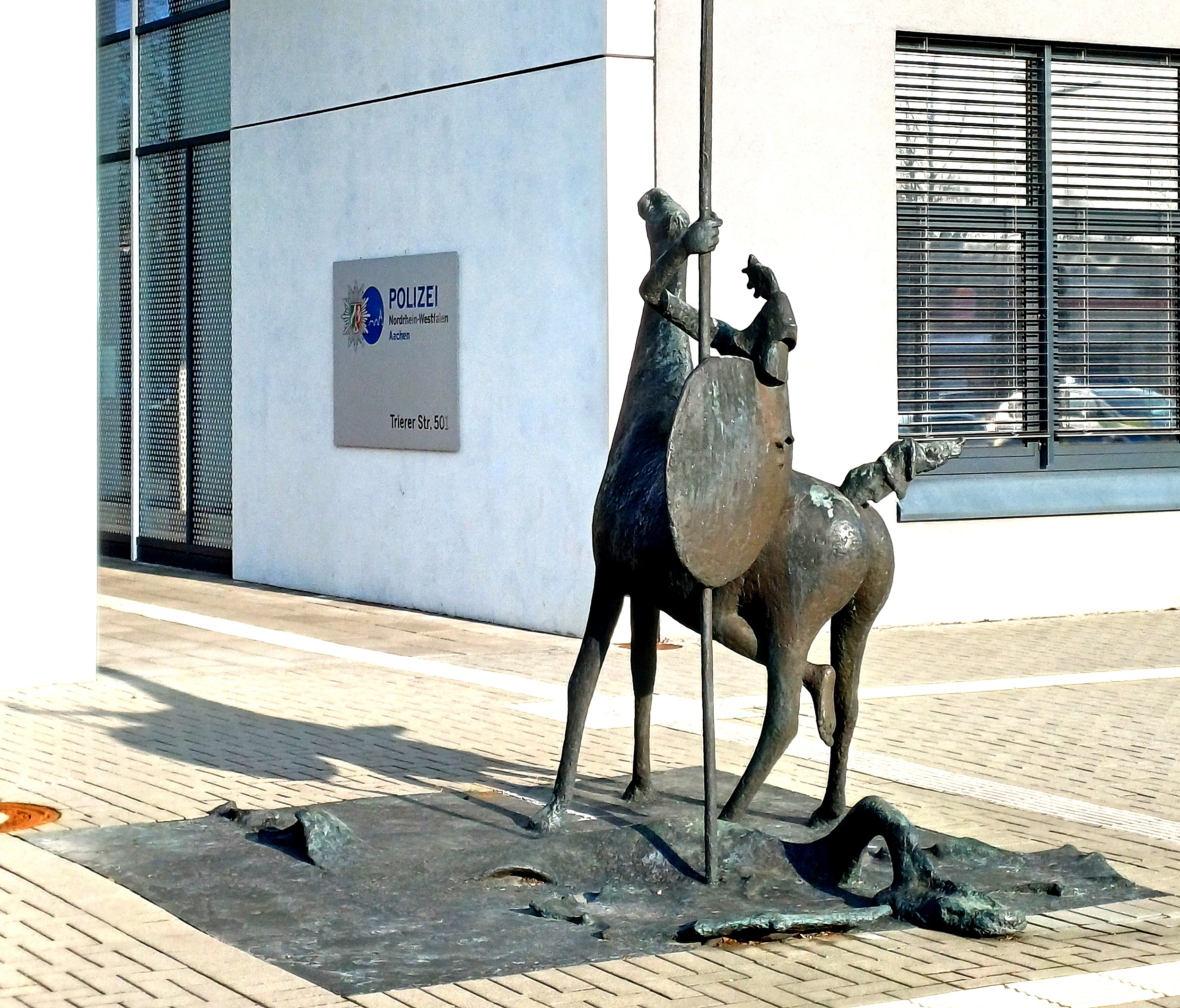
St. George

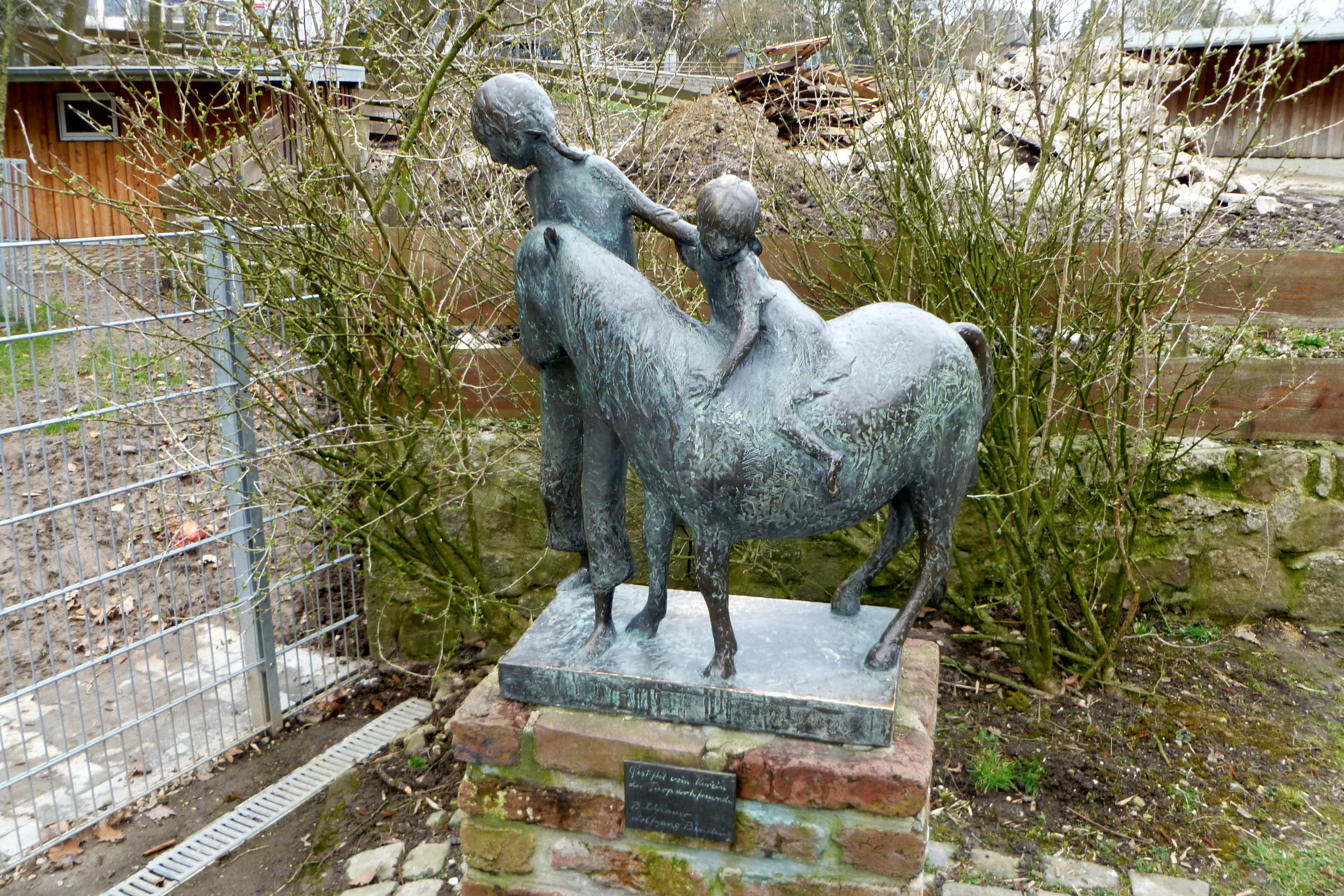
Horse-handler

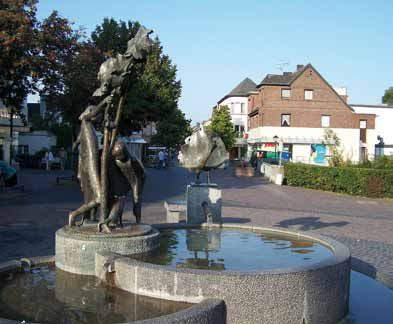
Play and adventure fountain

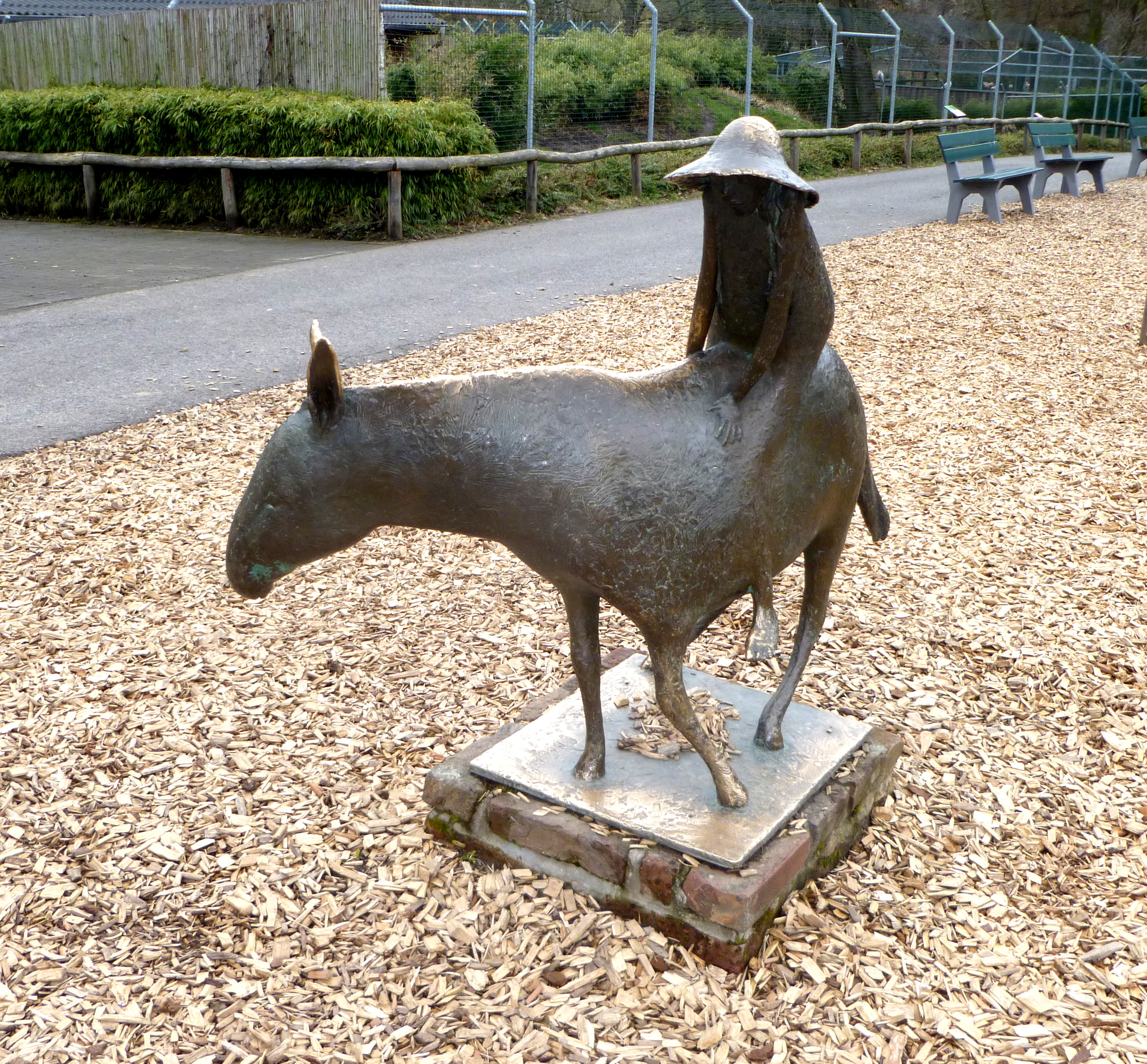
Donkey rider

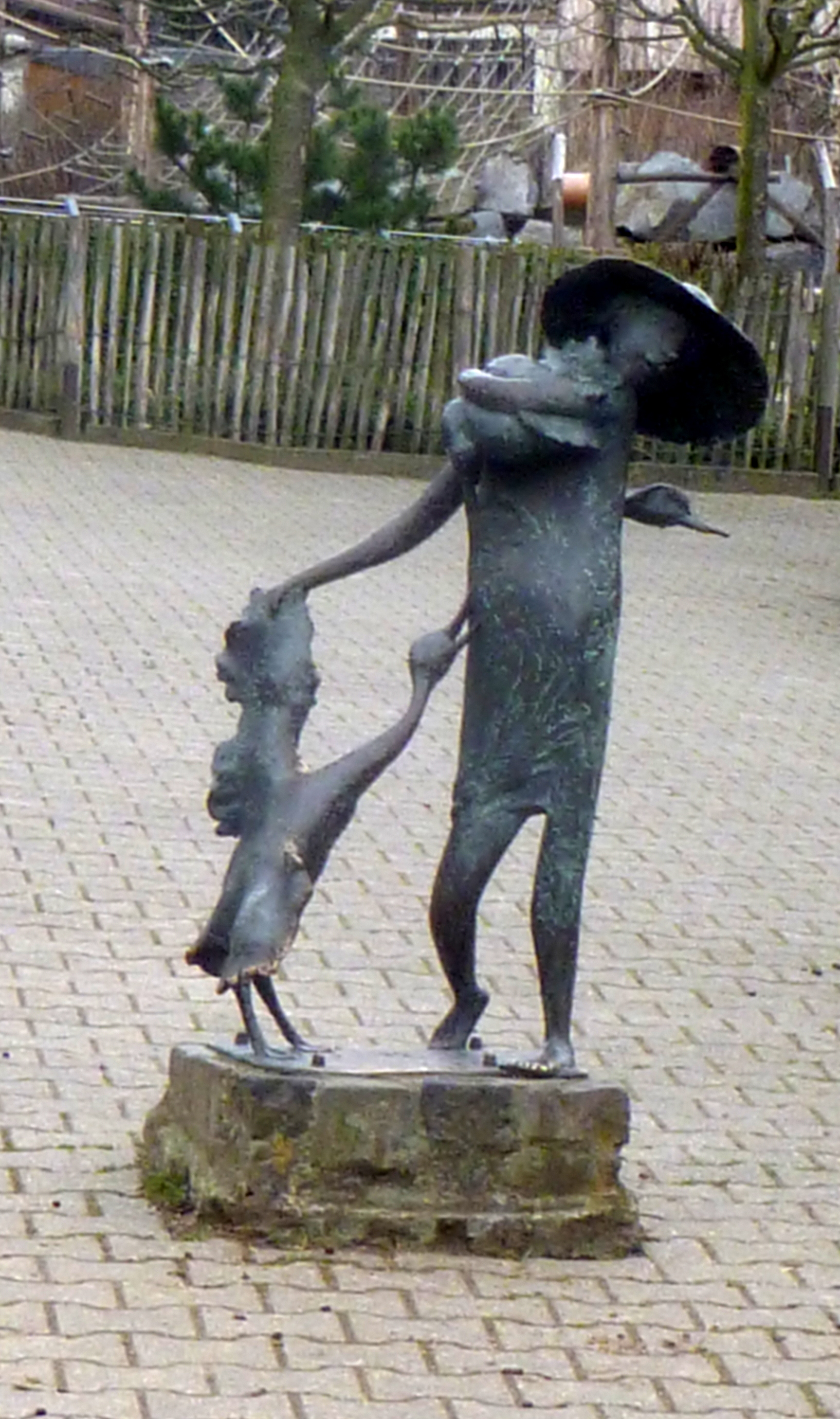
Duck catcher

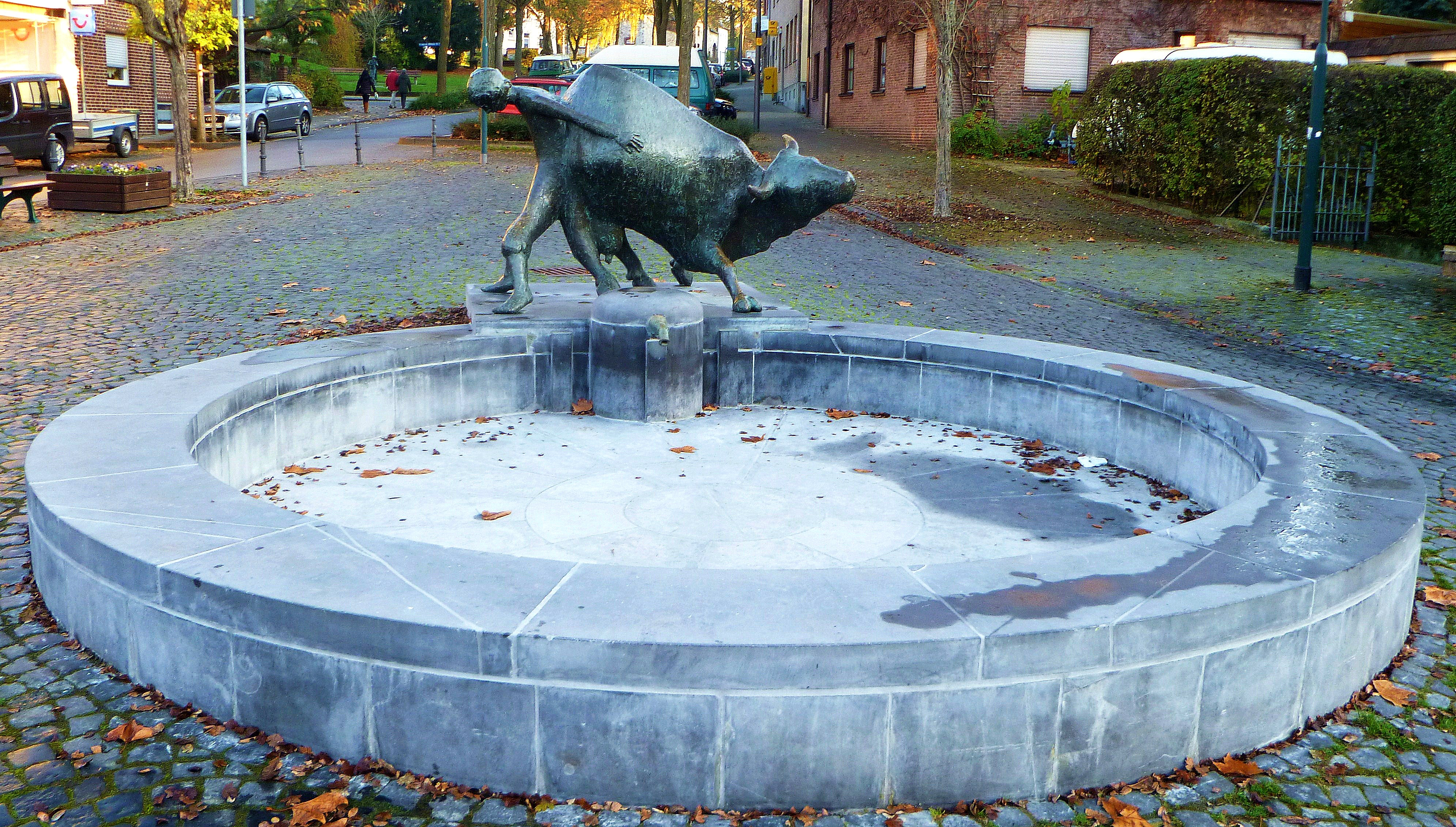
Boy pushes cow

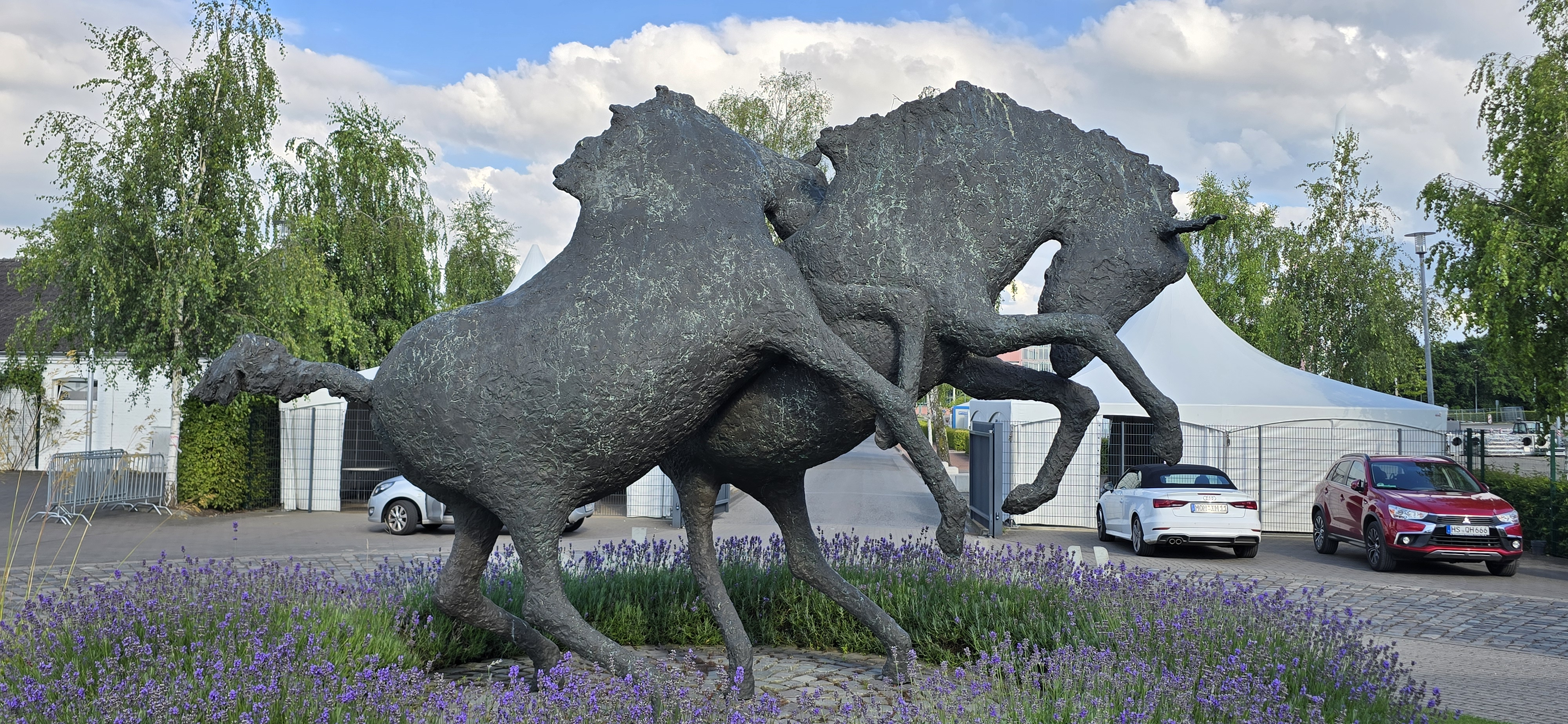
Playing horses
