= National Committee for the History of Art =

- Abbreviation: NCHA
- Formation: 1980
- Type: Non-profit / Academic affiliate
- Legal status: Active
- Region served: United States / International
- President: Jesús Escobar
- Affiliations: Comité International d'Histoire de l'Art (CIHA)
- Website: nchart.org

The National Committee for the History of Art (NCHA) is the U.S. affiliate of the Comité International d'Histoire de l'Art (CIHA, i.e. the international community of art historians). It was founded in 1980 by Irving Lavin.

Both committees aim to foster intellectual exchange among scholars and students interested in all fields of art history. They organize scholarly conferences and promote the communication, dissemination and exchange of knowledge and information about art history in order to promote a global community of art historians.

The NCHA is interested in developing global networks of art historians, particularly in areas of the world in which art history is an emerging discipline. Therefore, it brings together art historians from Africa, Asia, Latin America, the Middle East and Eastern Europe for discussions on the state of the discipline. The NCHA also provides travel support to congresses for students enrolled in US doctoral programs.

The current president of the NCHA is Jesús Escobar, the Charles E. and Emma H. Morrison Professor in the Humanities at Northwestern University.
