= Coercion castle =

Medieval infrastructure

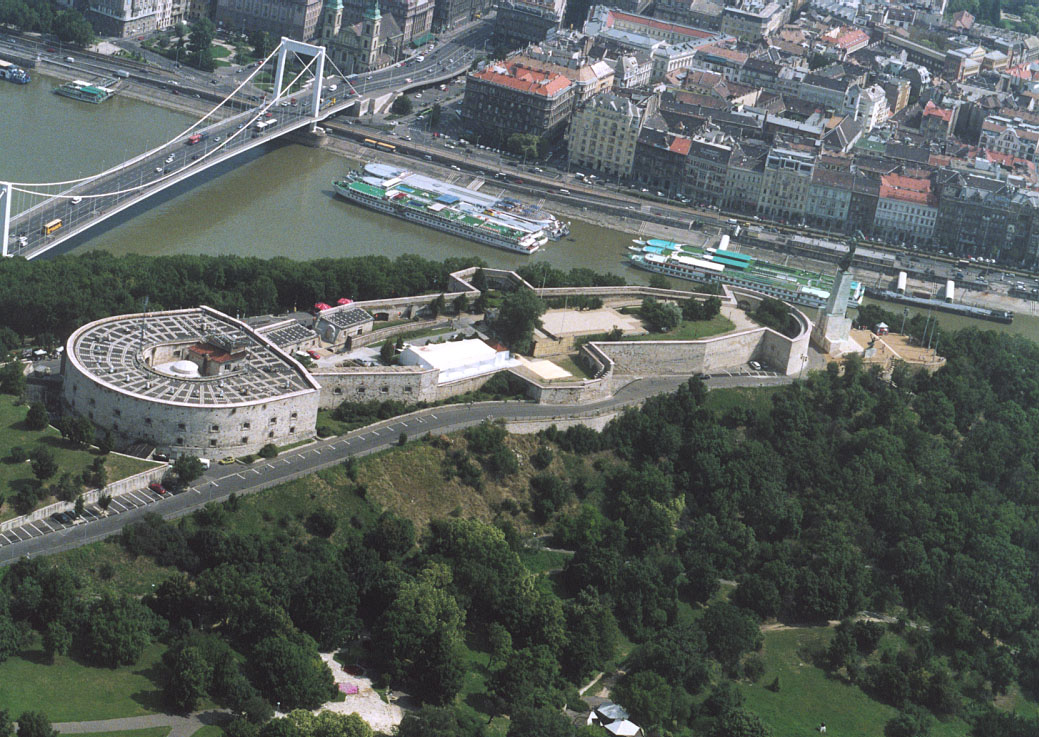
The Citadella, Budapest, Hungary

A coercion castle (German: Zwingburg) or coercive castle was a heavily fortified, medieval castle built to dominate the surrounding land. Such castles were built mainly in the High and Late Middle Ages in order to protect those territories in areas where the population was not assessed as being entirely loyal to the sovereign. Because of the poor infrastructure of medieval Europe, the construction of castles was one of the most important ways of exercising power, which is why it was governed by royal rights (known as regalia). Examples of coercive castles are the Moritzburg in Halle, which was built in the late 15th century, and the Alte Burg in Koblenz.

== Gallery ==
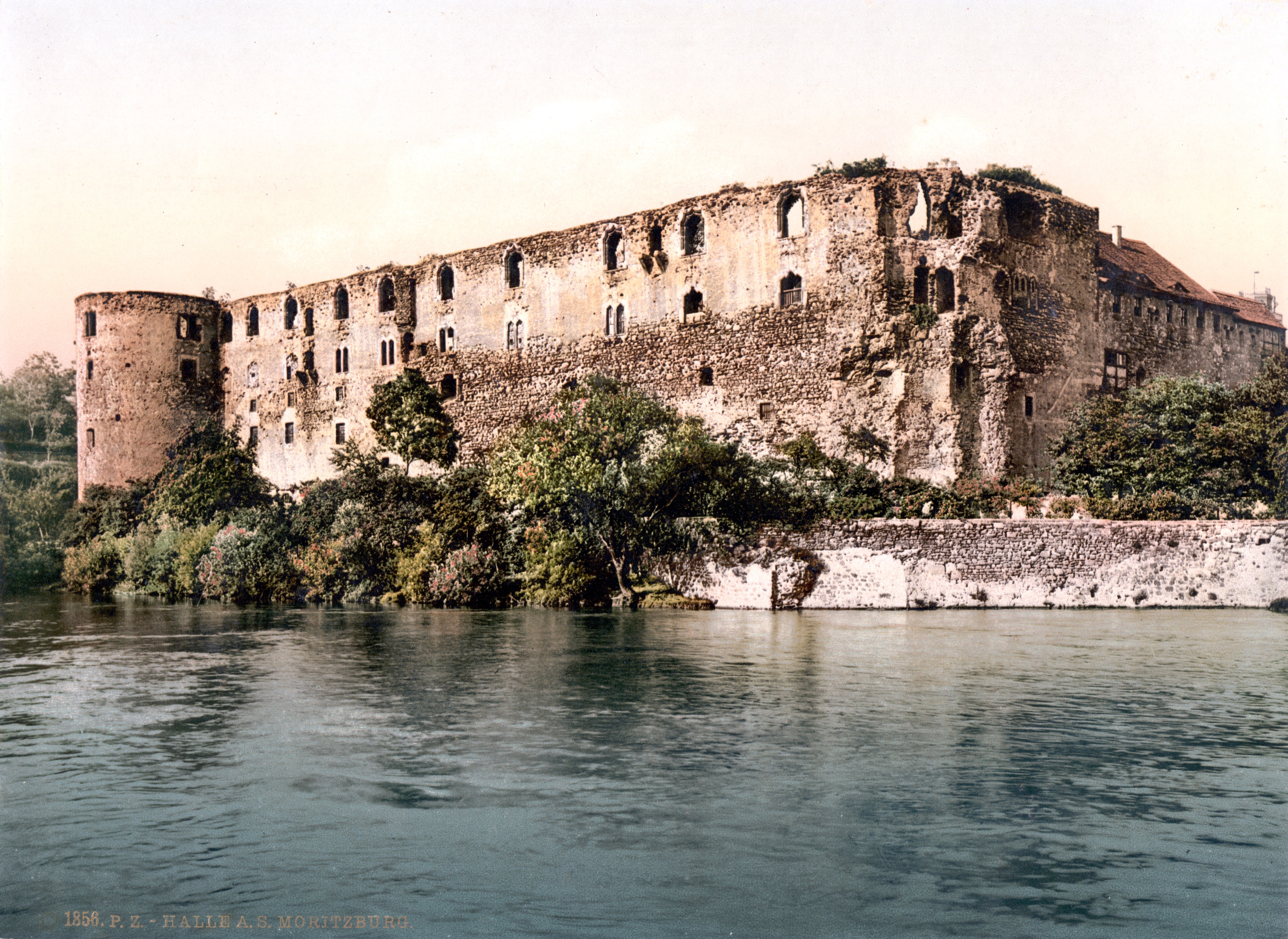
Moritzburg (Halle)

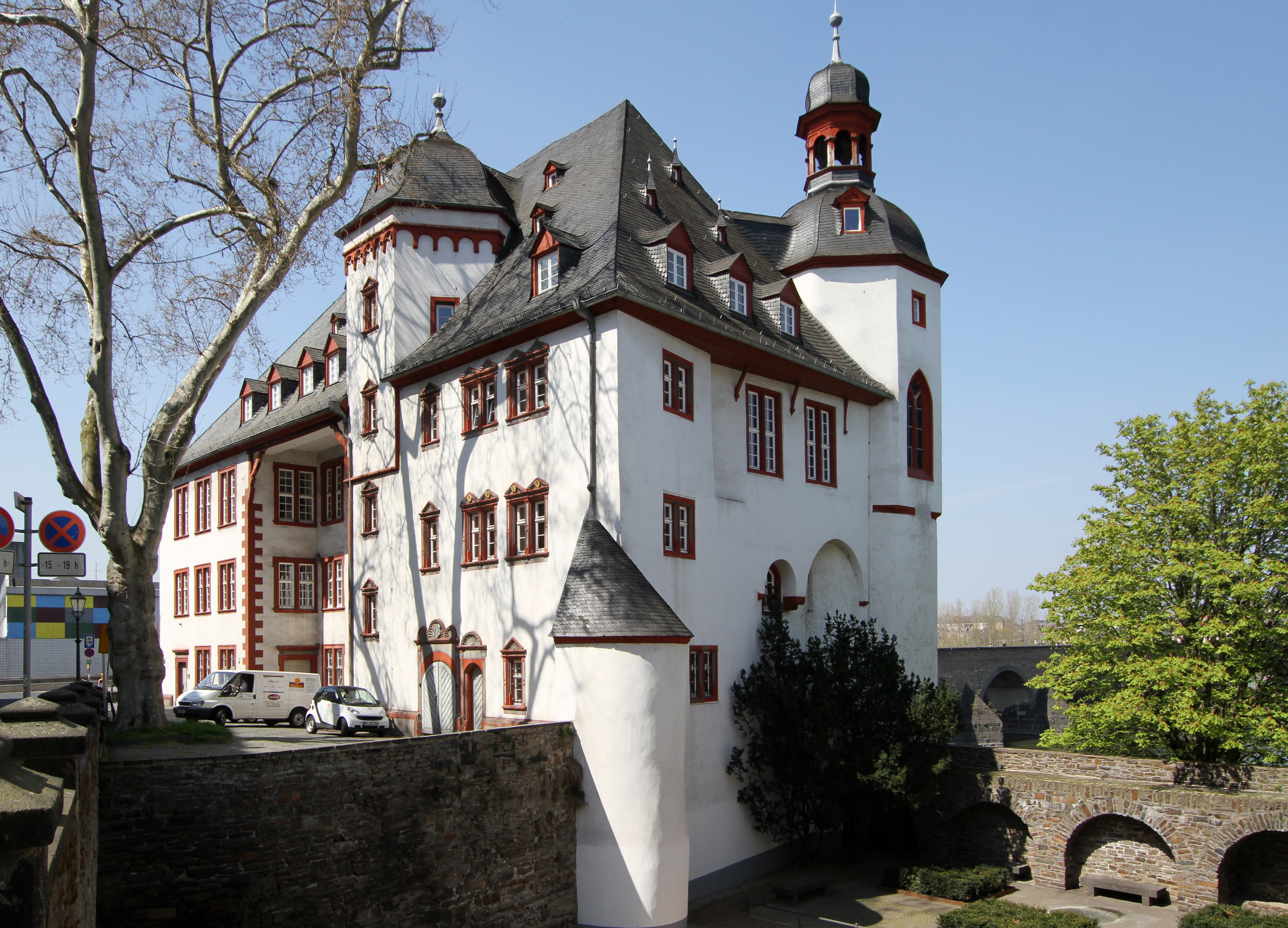
Alte Burg (Koblenz)

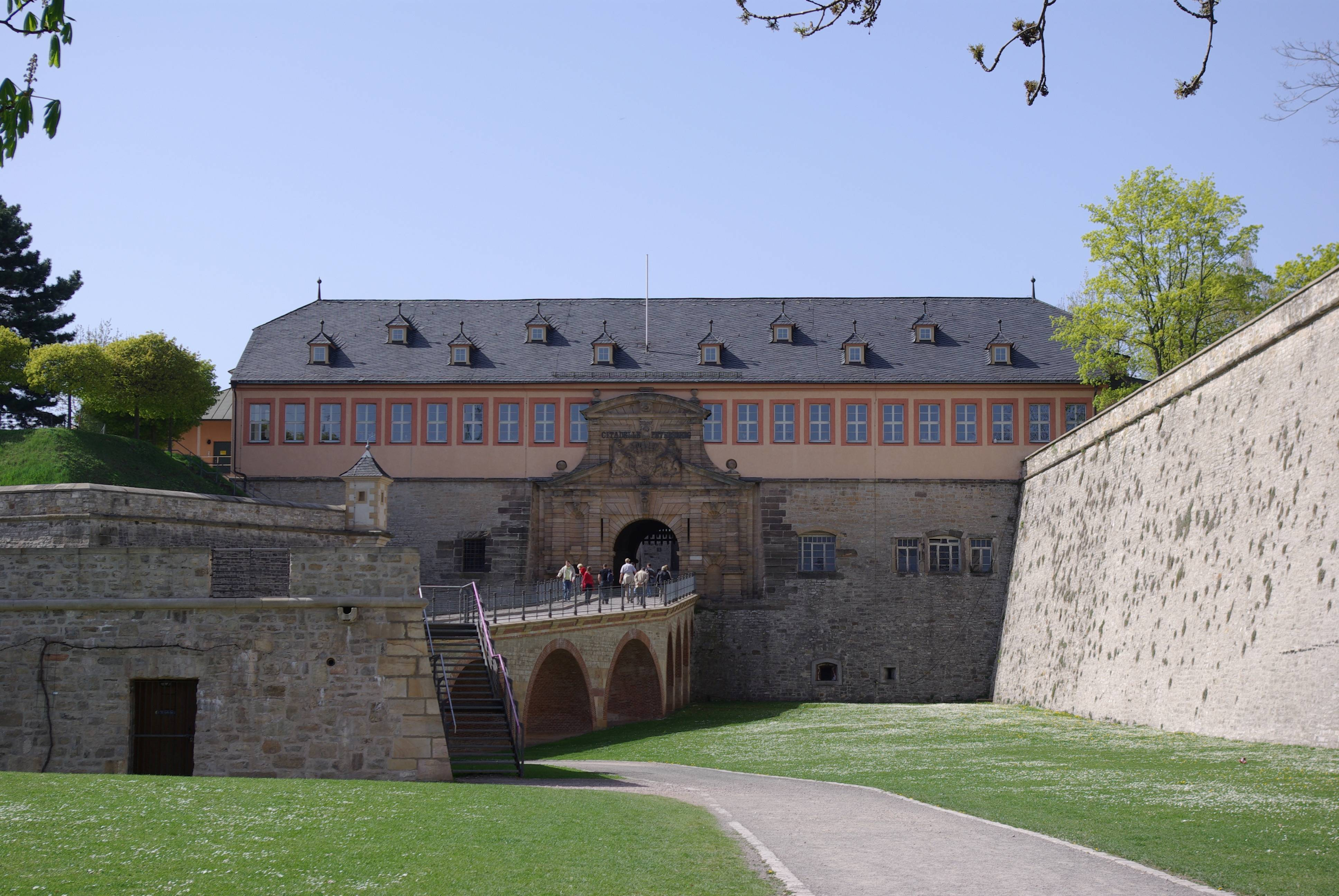
Petersberg Citadel (Erfurt)

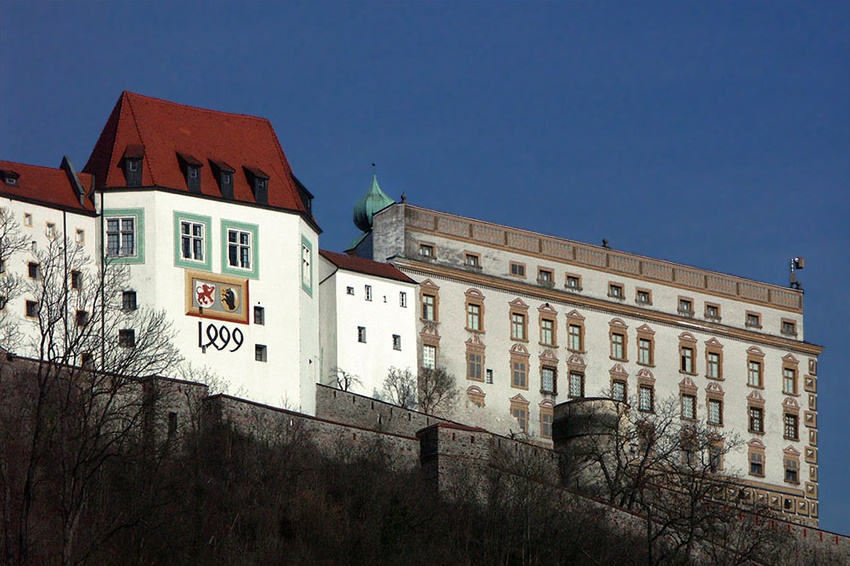
Veste Oberhaus (Passau)

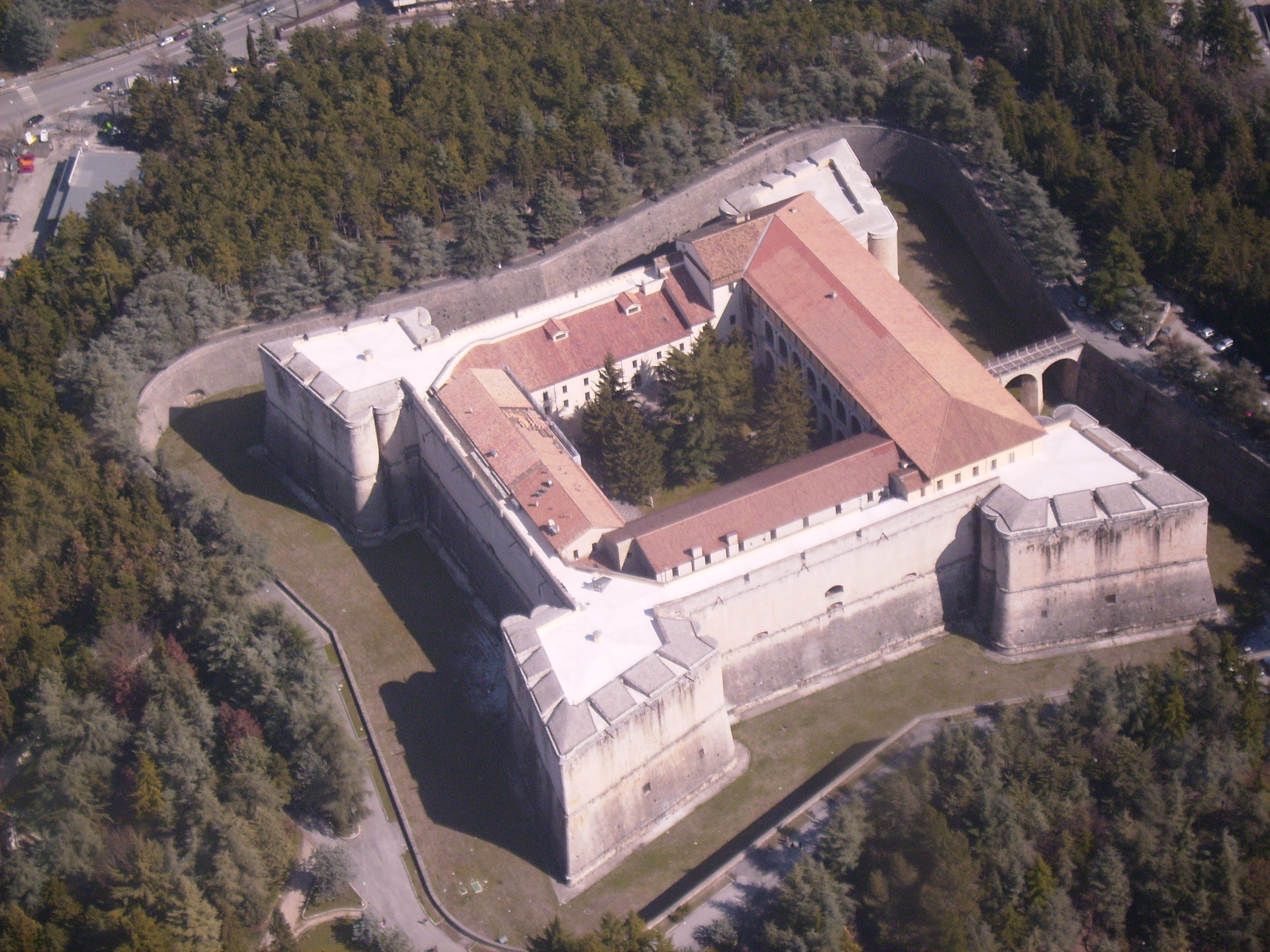
Forte Spagnolo (L’Aquila, Italy)

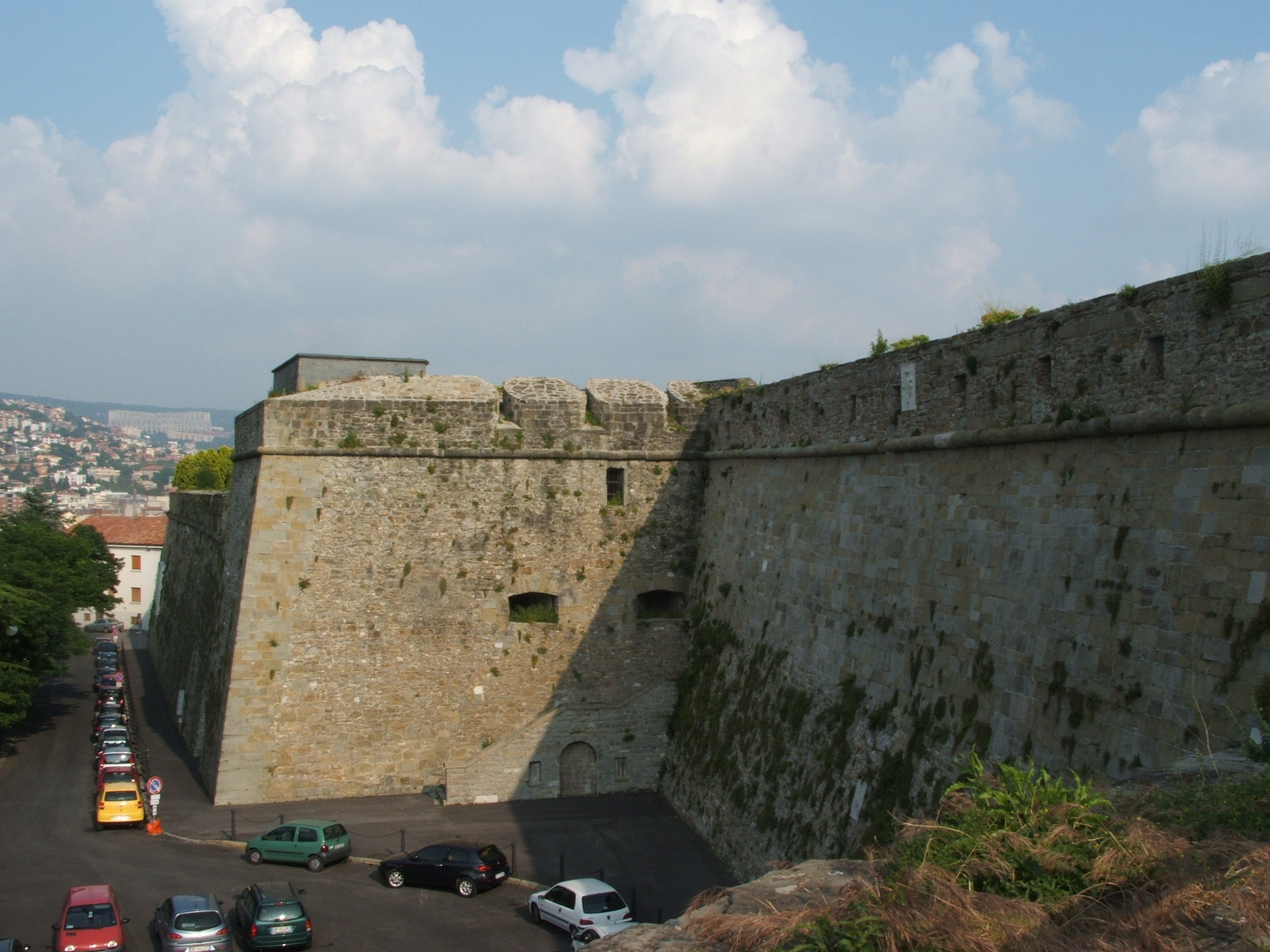
Castello di San Giusto (Triest, Italy)

== See also ==
- Counter castle
- Zwingenburg
