= Paul-Georg Custodis =

German architect and historic preservationist

Paul-Georg Custodis (born 13 January 1940) is a German architect and historic preservationist.

== Career ==
Custodis, Great-great-great-nephew of the royal court architect Max Joseph Custodis, was born in Hanover during World War II. The war years and the post-war period overshadowed his childhood. He comes from a Cologne family. From 1959 to 1966, he studied architecture at the Technische Universität Darmstadt. Subsequently, he trained for the higher civil engineering administrative service of the federal state of Nordrhein-Westfalen.

Custodis was head of the planning department of the city of Brühl (Rheinland) from 1969 to 1973. He then held a number of posts at the General Directorate for Cultural Heritage Rhineland-Palatinate from 1973 until his retirement in 2005: research fellow, area officer and finally construction director. In addition, he was the cross-sectional officer for industrial monument conservation there from 1984 to 2005. In this context, he was responsible for the restoration of the Sayner Hütte, a former ironworks in Bendorf, for over 10 years. Since 2010, he has been an honorary member of the Friends of the Sayner Hütte.

In 1979, he was awarded a doctorate in engineering from the RWTH Aachen University. The topic of his doctoral thesis was: Der Stadtbaumeister Eduard Kreyßig und die Bauentwicklung der Stadt Mainz in der 2nd Hälfte des 19 Jahrhunderts.

In the course of his life, Custodis was active as an author of scientific articles and reference books and as an amateur painter and draughtsman.

== Publications ==
- 1975: Bad Ems.
- 1975: Der Bildhauer Ferdinand Custodis.
- 1980: Nassau an der Lahn
- 1982: Mainz im Wandel: 1850–1900.
- 1984: Koblenz und der Mittelrhein
- 1985: Die Stadt des 19. Jahrhunderts in Rheinland-Pfalz
- 1990: Technische Denkmäler in Rheinland-Pfalz
- 1996: Burg Namedy in Andernach.
- 1998: Zeugnisse aus Industrie und Technik.
- 2000: Notizen zu Max Joseph Custodis. Architekt in Düsseldorf
- 2008: Apollinariskirche in Remagen
- 2008: Pfaffen-Schwabenheim
- 2011: Die Sayner Hütte.
- 2014: Von der Autobahnbrücke bis zur Ziegelei: Zeugnisse aus Technik und Wirtschaft in Rheinland-Pfalz.
- 2017: Vom Backen, Brauen, Keltern und Gerben: Zeugnisse der Herstellung von Nahrungs- und Genussmitteln sowie Bekleidung in Rheinland-Pfalz.
