= Matthias Untermann =

German art historian

Matthias Untermann (born 19 September 1956) is a German art historian and medieval archaeologist.

== Life ==
Matthias Untermann was born in Tübingen and is the son of the Indo-Germanist Jürgen Untermann. Matthias Untermann studied art history, classical archaeology and medieval history at the universities of Cologne and Zurich. In 1984, he was awarded a doctorate in medieval history under Günther Binding in Cologne. He worked on numerous excavations and research projects in the Rhineland, in Baden-Württemberg and with the city archaeology in Lübeck during his studies.

In 1985, Untermann became a research assistant at the Landesamt für Denkmalpflege Baden-Württemberg. There he worked at the Department of Medieval Archaeology and Building Research in Stuttgart and Freiburg im Breisgau, focusing on archaeology of the buildings of monastic communities as well as urban archaeology. In this context, he carried out several important excavations on urban archaeology in Freiburg.

In 1998, Untermann conducted post-doctoral work in art history and medieval archaeology at the University of Freiburg under Wilhelm Schlink and Heiko Steuer. In the winter semester 1999/2000 he began teaching at the Institute for European Art History of the Ruprecht-Karls-Universität.

Untermann edits the newsletter of the German Society for Medieval and Modern Archaeology (DGAMN).

His research interests include:

- Medieval sacred architecture and its furnishings, with particular attention to the border areas with archaeology, medieval history and liturgical history.
- Semantics of medieval architecture
- Archaeology of the High and Late Middle Ages, especially in an urban context
- Methodological questions in the dialogue between regional history - art history - archaeology - building research.

== Selected publications ==
=== Archaeology of the Middle Ages ===
- among others (2005): Fragmente eines Benediktinerklosters: St. Georgen im Schwarzwald. In Südwestdt. Beitr. Hausforsch., Jg. 6, pp. 9–214.
- 2003: Ausgrabungen und Bauuntersuchungen in Klöstern, Grangien und Stadthöfen. Forschungsbericht und kommentierte Bibliographie. Berlin: Lukas-Verlag (Studien zur Geschichte, Kunst und Kultur der Zisterzienser, 17).
- with Galioto, Luisa; Löbbecke, Frank (ed.) (2002): Das Haus „Zum roten Basler Stab“ (Salzstraße 20) in Freiburg im Breisgau. Stuttgart: Theiss (Forschungen und Berichte der Archäologie des Mittelalters in Baden-Württemberg, 25).
- with Helmig, Guido; Scholkmann, Barbara (ed.) (2002): Centre, Region, Periphery. Medieval Europe Basel 2002. 3rd International Congress of Medieval and Later Archaeology. 3 volumes. Hertingen.
- 2001: Kontinuitätsbrüche: Neue Städte neben römischen Zentren in Süd- und Westdeutschland. In Beitr. Mittelalterarch. Austria, Jg. 17, pp. 117–132.
- 1997: The deserted medieval town "Münster" in the Black Forest. Archaeological investigation 1995–1997. In Gye de Boe, Frans Verhaeghe (ed.): Urbanism in Medieval Europe. Papers of the 'Medieval Europe Brugge 1997' Conference. Zellik (I.A.P. Rapp, 1), pp. 361–368.
- 1995: Archäologische Befunde zur Frühgeschichte der Stadt Freiburg. In Schadek, Hans; Zotz, Thomas (ed.): Freiburg 1091 - 1120. Neue Forschungen zu den Anfängen der Stadt. Sigmaringen: Thorbecke (Archäologie und Geschichte, 7), pp. 195–230.
- 1995: Archäologische Beobachtungen zu den Freiburger Altstadt-Straßen und zur Entstehung der „Bächle“. In Schauinsland, Jg. 114, pp. 9–26.
- 1995: Das „Harmonie“-Gelände in Freiburg im Breisgau. Stuttgart: Thesis (Forschungen und Berichte der Archäologie des Mittelalters in Baden-Württemberg, 19).
- (ed.) 1995: Die Latrine des Augustinereremiten-Klosters in Freiburg im Breisgau. Stuttgart (Materialhefte zur Archäologie in Baden-Württemberg).
- (ed.) 1995: Fridolinskult und Hammerschmiede. Neue archäologische Untersuchungen zu Stift und Stadt Bad Säckingen. Stuttgart: Gesellschaft für Vor- und Frühgeschichte in Württemberg und Hohenzollern (Archäologische Informationen aus Baden-Württemberg, 31).
- 1991: Mariental monastery in Steinheim an der Murr. Römisches Bad, Grafenhof, Kloster. Stuttgart: Theiss (Führer zu archäologischen Denkmälern in Baden-Württemberg, 13).
- with Gross, Uwe (1987): Mittelalterliche Siedlungsbefunde in Ditzingen, Kreis Ludwigsburg. In: Archäologische Ausgrabungen in Baden-Württemberg, pp. 186–190.
- 1984: Die Grabungen auf der Burg Berge (Mons)-Altenberg (Gem. Odenthal, Rheinisch-Bergischer Kreis). Bonn (Rheinische Ausgrabungen, 25).

=== History of art ===
- (1989): Der Zentralbau im Mittelalter. Form – Funktion – Verbreitung. Darmstadt: Wissenschaftliche Buchgesellschaft.
- (2001): Forma Ordinis. Die mittelalterliche Baukunst der Zisterzienser. Munich: Deutscher Kunstverlag (Kunstwissenschaftliche Studien, 89).
- with Günther Binding (2001): Kleine Kunstgeschichte der mittelalterlichen Ordensbaukunst in Deutschland. 3., erg. Aufl. Stuttgart: Theiss.
- with Dorothee Bek, Kristina Hahn(2008): Klöster in Deutschland. Ein Führer. Stuttgart: Philipp Reclam jun.
- (2009): Handbuch der mittelalterlichen Architektur
