= Udo Mainzer =

German art historian (born 1945)

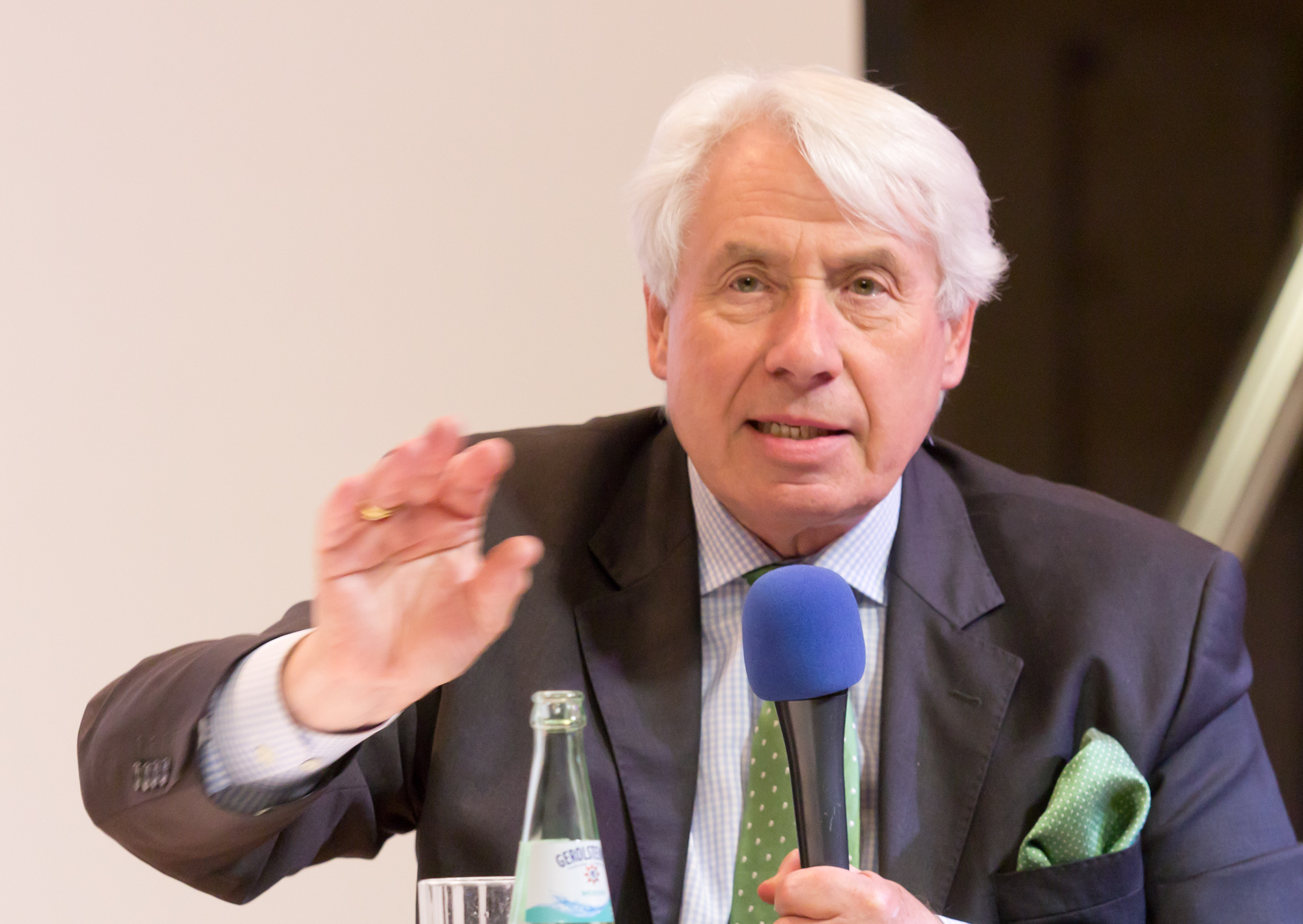
Udo Mainzer 2014

Udo Mainzer (born 3 July 1945) is a German art historian and monument conservator. He held office until September 2011. as director of the LVR-Amt für Denkmalpflege im Rheinland and Landeskonservator of the Landschaftsverband Rheinland.

== Career ==
Born in Witterda, Thuringia, Mainzer studied history, art history and archaeology at the University of Cologne from 1968 and obtained his doctorate there in 1973 under Günther Binding with a dissertation on Stadttore im Rheinland. Since 1976, he has been a lecturer in art history and monument preservation at the Faculty of Philosophy there and was appointed honorary professor in 1983.

After completing his studies, Mainzer worked as deputy diocesan curator of the Roman Catholic Diocese of Trier and then as district curator in Landschaftsverband Westfalen-Lippe. In 1979 he was appointed to the LVR Office for the Preservation of Monuments in the Rhineland, based first in Bonn and from 1985 at Brauweiler Abbey in Brauweiler. In his last years of service (at least since 2008), he was the longest-serving state conservator in Germany.

== Honours and honorary posts ==
In 1998, Mainzer received the Medal of Honour of the Cologne University of Applied Sciences and in 2004 the Cross of Merit of the Verdienstorden der Republik Polen. He is a member of the Deutsche Akademie für Städtebau und Landesplanung, chairman of the advisory board of the project "baukunst-nrw" and in 2002 was a member of the founding circle for the establishment of the Bundesstiftung Baukultur. Mainzer is the author and editor of more than 250 articles, books and specialist publication series on heritage conservation, monument protection and architectural history.

Since 2011, Mainzer has been a member of the Board of Trustees of the Kulturstiftung Kölner Dom.

== Publications ==
- Stadttore im Rheinland. Abt. Architektur des Kunsthistor. Instituts der Universität Köln. Diss. 1973.
- Stadttore im Rheinland. Rheinischer Verein f. Denkmalpflege u. Landschaftsschutz, 1976. ISBN 978-3-88094-015-4
- (ed.): Gartenkultur im Rheinland: Vom Mittelalter bis zur Moderne. Imhof Verlag, Petersberg, 2003. ISBN 978-3-935590-94-5
- with Günther Binding and Anita Wiedenau: Kleine Kunstgeschichte des deutschen Fachwerkbaus. 4th edition. Wissenschaftliche Buchgesellschaft, 1989, ISBN 978-3-534-06900-2
- (ed.): Was ist ein Baudenkmal? Eine Beispielsammlung zur Begriffsbestimmung. Rheinland Verlag GmbH, Köln 1983
- (ed.): Denkmalpflege in der Praxis. Rheinland-Verlag, Bonn. ISBN 978-3-7927-0815-6
- (ed.): Paul Clemen: Zur 125. Wiederkehr seines Geburtstages. Köln 1991.
- (ed.) with Petra Leser): Architektur-Geschichten: Festschrift für Günther Binding zum 60. Geburtstag. J.P. Bachem Verlag, 1996. ISBN 978-3-7616-1281-1
- Dehio, Georg: Handbuch der deutschen Kunstdenkmäler. NRW I; Rheinland. Bearb. Claudia Euskirchen among others Mit einer Einführung von Udo Mainzer. Deutscher Kunst-Verlag, Munich, 2005. ISBN 978-3-422-03093-0
- Kleine illustrierte Kunstgeschichte der Stadt Köln. Bachem, Cologne 2015, ISBN 978-3-7616-2888-1.
- Kleine illustrierte Architekturgeschichte der Stadt Köln. J. P. Bachem, Cologne 2017, ISBN 978-3-7616-3108-9.
