= Baldwin Bridge, Koblenz =

Bridge in Koblenz

Baldwin Bridge, Koblenz Balduinbrücke
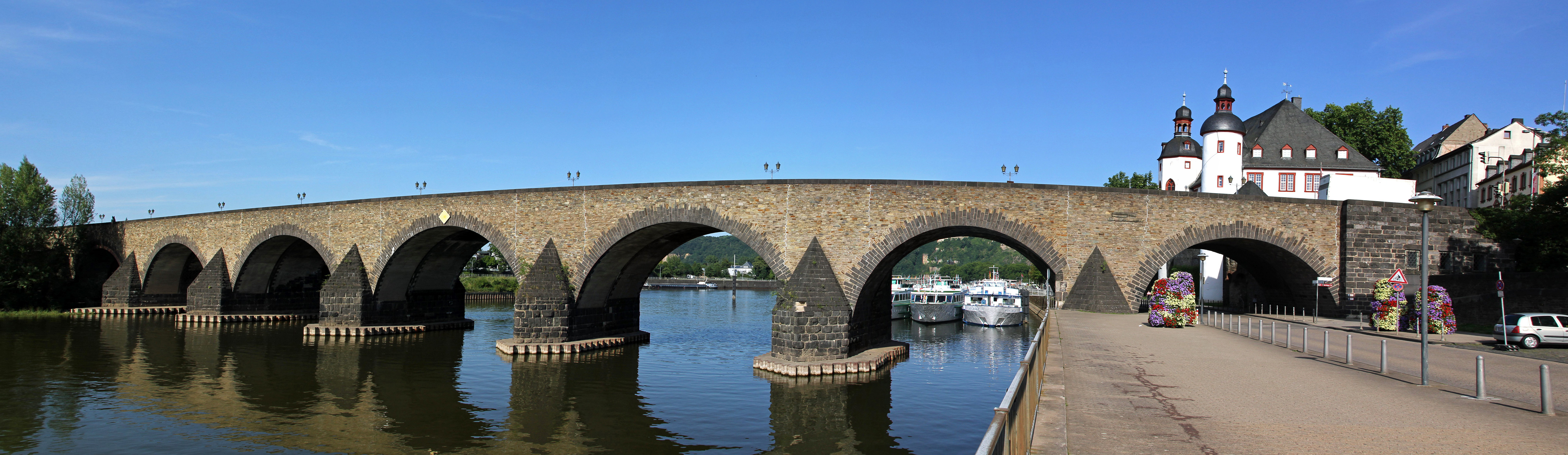
- View of the Baldwin Bridge from the west
- Coordinates: 50.3639°N 7.5931°E
- Carries: road, footpath and cycleway
- Crosses: Moselle
- Locale: Koblenz

Characteristics
- Material: Stone arch bridge / prestressed concrete bridge
- Total length: 475 metres (1,558 ft)
- Width: 12 metres (39 ft)

History
- Architect: Baldwin of Luxembourg
- Construction start: c. 1344 (um 1342/1343)
- Construction end: 1429

Location
- Interactive map of Baldwin Bridge, Koblenz

The Baldwin Bridge (German: Balduinbrücke) is a stone arch bridge over the Moselle in Koblenz, Germany. It is the oldest surviving bridge in the city and was built in the 14th century (1332-1363) under Archbishop Baldwin of Luxembourg.

== See also ==
- List of bridges in Germany
