= Herbert von Einem =

German art historian

- Born: February 16, 1905; Sarrebourg, Lorraine
- Died: August 5, 1983 (aged 78); Göttingen, Germany
- Citizenship: German
- Education: University of Göttingen; Humboldt University of Berlin; Ludwig-Maximilians-Universität München
- Occupation: Art historian
- Awards: Commander's Cross of the Order of Merit of the Federal Republic of Germany

Herbert von Einem (16 February 1905 in Sarrebourg, Lorraine, – 5 August 1983 in Göttingen) was a German art historian.

== Life and work ==
Von Einem studied art history at the University of Göttingen, the Humboldt University of Berlin, and the Ludwig-Maximilians-Universität München. In 1928, he completed his PhD, entitled Die Plastik der Lüneburger Goldenen Tafel under Georg Vitzthum von Eckstädt, director of the art history seminar in Göttingen. In 1935, he wrote his Habilitationsschrift at the Martin Luther University Halle-Wittenberg on Carl Ludwig Fernow. In 1937, he was an assistant of Vitzthum in Göttingen, and in 1938 a lecturer in art history. During the Nazi era, he promoted a nationalist-defined art history. From 1943 to 1945, he taught art history at the University of Greifswald.

In 1947, Von Einem was appointed professor of art history at the University of Bonn and launched there, together with Heinrich Lützeler, the Institute of the History of Art, which he increased in the following years. Until 1971, with Lützeler, Von Einem was also editor of the Bonner Beiträge zur Kunstwissenschaft. He retired in 1970. His book on Michelangelo was translated into five languages.

== Select publications ==
- Caspar David Friedrich. Berlin: Rembrandt-Verlag, 1938.
- Carl Ludwig Fernow, Römische Briefe an Johann Pohrt 1793–1798. Berlin: W. de Gruyter, 1944.
- Die Bildnisse der deutschen Künstler in Rom, 1800–1830. Berlin: Deutscher Verein für Kunstwissenschaft, 1952.
- Beiträge zu Goethes Kunstauffassung. Hamburg: von Schröder, 1956.
- Michelangelo: Bildhauer, Maler, Baumeister. Berlin: Gebrüder Mann, 1959.
- Stil und Überlieferung: Aufsätze zur Kunstgeschichte des Abendlandes. Dusseldorf: L. Schwann, 1971.
- Das Programm der Stanza della Segnatura im Vatikan. Opladen: Westdeutscher Verlag, 1971.
- Giorgione: der Maler als Dichter. Mainz and Wiesbaden: Verlag der Akademie der Wissenschaften und der Literatur, 1972.
- Die Medicimadonna Michelangelos. Opladen: Westdeutscher Verlag, 1973.
- "Die Folgen des Krieges": ein Alterswerk von Peter Paul Rubens. Opladen: Westdeutscher Verlag, 1975.
- Deutsche Malerei des Klassizismus und der Romantik, 1760–1840. Munich: Beck, 1978.
