= Rhineland-Palatinate General Directorate for Cultural Heritage =

Rhineland-Palatinate state agency

- Generaldirektion Kulturelles Erbe; Rheinland-Pfalz
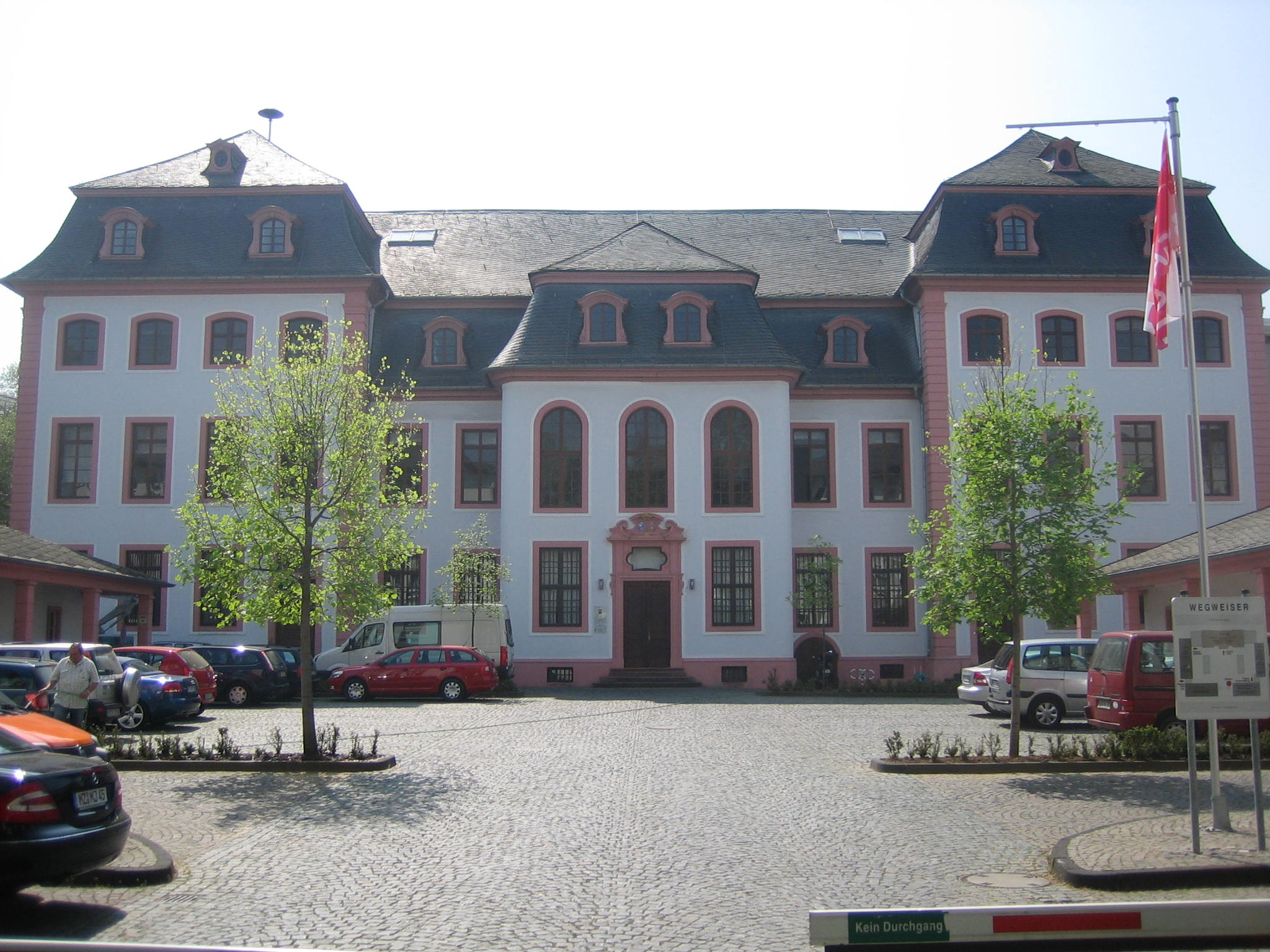

Agency overview
- Formed: January 1, 2007
- Jurisdiction: Rhineland-Palatinate
- Headquarters: Erthaler Hof, Mainz; 50°4′18.7068″N 8°15′6.2676″E
- Agency executive: Dr. Heike Otto, Director General
- Parent department: Ministry of the Interior and Sport
- Website: mwwk.rlp.de

The Rhineland-Palatinate General Directorate for Cultural Heritage (German: Generaldirektion Kulturelles Erbe Rheinland-Pfalz, GDKE; or Generaldirektion Kulturelles Erbe RLP) is a state agency responsible for monument protection and preservation in the Rhineland-Palatinate. In addition to the Directorate of Castles, Palaces and Antiquities, its responsibilities include the three state museums in Koblenz, Mainz and Trier as well as the State Monument Preservation and State Archaeology Directorates as monument authorities.

In 2021, Markus Poschmann of the State Archaeology Directorate at Koblenz, who is an expert in prehistoric sea scorpions of the eurypterid order, co-authored a study with Andrew Rozenfeldz of Queensland Museum in Australia, describing a possible second species in the Woodwardopterus genus. Named Woodwardopterus freemanorum, the specimen gained extra significance when it was found to be the last known fossil of eurypterid in the world, having lived not long before the end of Permian extinction event, in which around 96 per cent of species went extinct.
