= A. franzi =

A. franzi may refer to:

- Abacetus franzi, a ground beetle
- Acerentomon franzi, a proturan found in Europe and Northern Asia
- Afrogamasellus franzi, a mite
