= Catulus (disambiguation) =

Gaius Lutatius Catulus (242–241 BC) was a Roman statesman and naval commander in the First Punic War.

Catulus may also refer to:

== People ==
- Quintus Lutatius Catulus (consul 102 BC) (149–87 BC), consul of the Roman Republic in 102 BC
- Quintus Lutatius Catulus Capitolinus (c. 121–61 BC), politician in the late Roman Republic

== Animals ==
- Elysia catulus, a species of sea slug in the family Plakobranchidae
- Gracilentulus catulus, a species of proturan in the family Acerentomidae
- Megachile catulus, a species of bee in the family Megachilidae
- Stichopogon catulus, a species of robber flies in the family Asilidae
- Temnosternus catulus, a species of beetle in the family Cerambycidae

== Other uses ==
- Catulus (fungus), a genus of fungus in the class Dothideomycetes
