= Nipponentomon macleani =

Scientific classification
- Domain: Eukaryota
- Kingdom: Animalia
- Phylum: Arthropoda
- Order: Protura
- Family: Acerentomidae
- Genus: Nipponentomon
- Species: N. macleani

Binomial name
- Nipponentomon macleani Nosek, 1977

Species of insect-like animal

Nipponentomon macleani is a species of proturan in the family Acerentomidae found in North America. It is a type of soil-dwelling organism.
