= Nipponentomon bifidum =

Scientific classification
- Domain: Eukaryota
- Kingdom: Animalia
- Phylum: Arthropoda
- Order: Protura
- Family: Acerentomidae
- Genus: Nipponentomon
- Species: N. bifidum

Binomial name
- Nipponentomon bifidum Rusek, 1974

Species of insect-like animal

Nipponentomon bifidum is a species of proturan in the family Acerentomidae. It is found in North America.
