= Verrucoentomon rafalskii =

Scientific classification
- Domain: Eukaryota
- Kingdom: Animalia
- Phylum: Arthropoda
- Order: Protura
- Family: Acerentomidae
- Genus: Verrucoentomon
- Species: V. rafalskii

Binomial name
- Verrucoentomon rafalskii Szeptycki, 1997

Species of insect-like animal

Verrucoentomon rafalskii is a species of proturan in the family Acerentomidae. It is found in Europe and Northern Asia (excluding China).
