= Vesiculentomon ruseki =

Scientific classification
- Domain: Eukaryota
- Kingdom: Animalia
- Phylum: Arthropoda
- Order: Protura
- Family: Acerentomidae
- Genus: Vesiculentomon
- Species: V. ruseki

Binomial name
- Vesiculentomon ruseki Nosek, 1977

Species of insect-like animal

Vesiculentomon ruseki is a species of proturan in the family Acerentomidae. It is found in North America.
