= Kenyentulus monlongensis =

Scientific classification
- Domain: Eukaryota
- Kingdom: Animalia
- Phylum: Arthropoda
- Order: Protura
- Family: Acerentomidae
- Genus: Kenyentulus
- Species: K. monlongensis

Binomial name
- Kenyentulus monlongensis Yin, 1983

Species of insect-like animal

Kenyentulus monlongensis is a species of proturan in the family Acerentomidae. It is found in North America.
