= Silvestridia africana =

Scientific classification
- Domain: Eukaryota
- Kingdom: Animalia
- Phylum: Arthropoda
- Order: Protura
- Family: Acerentomidae
- Genus: Silvestridia
- Species: S. africana

Binomial name
- Silvestridia africana Yin & Dallai, 1985

Species of insect-like animal

Silvestridia africana is a species of proturan in the family Acerentomidae. It is found in Africa.
