= Gracilentulus meridianus =

Scientific classification
- Kingdom: Animalia
- Phylum: Arthropoda
- Class: Entognatha
- Order: Protura
- Family: Acerentomidae
- Genus: Gracilentulus
- Species: G. meridianus

Binomial name
- Gracilentulus meridianus (Condé, 1945)

Species of insect-like animal

Gracilentulus meridianus is a species of proturan in the family Acerentomidae. It is found in Europe and Northern Asia (excluding China).
