= Gracilentulus europeus =

Scientific classification
- Domain: Eukaryota
- Kingdom: Animalia
- Phylum: Arthropoda
- Order: Protura
- Family: Acerentomidae
- Genus: Gracilentulus
- Species: G. europeus

Binomial name
- Gracilentulus europeus Szeptycki, 1993

Species of insect-like animal

Gracilentulus europeus is a species of proturan in the family Acerentomidae.
