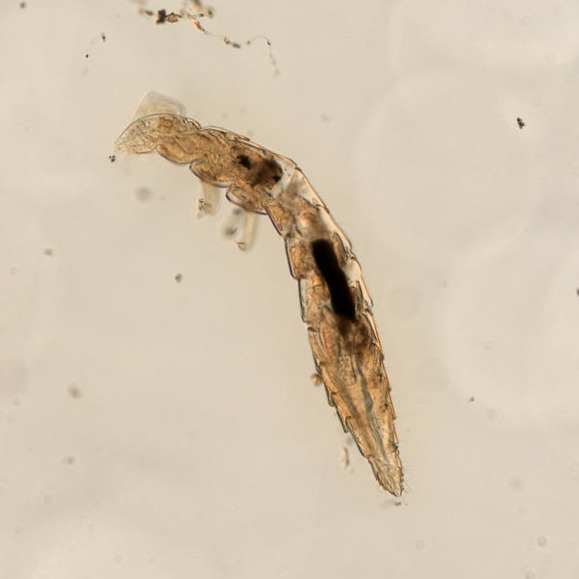

Scientific classification
- Domain: Eukaryota
- Kingdom: Animalia
- Phylum: Arthropoda
- Order: Protura
- Family: Acerentomidae
- Genus: Gracilentulus
- Species: G. floridanus

Binomial name
- Gracilentulus floridanus (Ewing, 1924)

= Gracilentulus floridanus =

Species of insect-like animal

Gracilentulus floridanus is a species of proturan in the family Acerentomidae. It is found in North America.
