= Verrucoentomon joannis =

Scientific classification
- Domain: Eukaryota
- Kingdom: Animalia
- Phylum: Arthropoda
- Order: Protura
- Family: Acerentomidae
- Genus: Verrucoentomon
- Species: V. joannis

Binomial name
- Verrucoentomon joannis Szeptycki, 1988

Species of insect-like animal

Verrucoentomon joannis is a species of proturan in the family Acerentomidae. It is found in Europe and Northern Asia (excluding China).
