= Yichunentulus yichunensis =

Scientific classification
- Domain: Eukaryota
- Kingdom: Animalia
- Phylum: Arthropoda
- Order: Protura
- Family: Acerentomidae
- Genus: Yichunentulus
- Species: Y. yichunensis

Binomial name
- Yichunentulus yichunensis Yin, 1980

Species of insect-like animal

Yichunentulus yichunensis is a species of proturan in the family Acerentomidae. It is found in Southern Asia.
