= Acerentomon microrhinus =

Scientific classification
- Domain: Eukaryota
- Kingdom: Animalia
- Phylum: Arthropoda
- Order: Protura
- Family: Acerentomidae
- Genus: Acerentomon
- Species: A. microrhinus

Binomial name
- Acerentomon microrhinus Berlese, 1909

Species of insect-like animal

Acerentomon microrhinus is a species of proturan in the family Acerentomidae. It is found in Europe and Northern Asia (excluding China).
