= Imadateiella sphaerempodia =

Scientific classification
- Domain: Eukaryota
- Kingdom: Animalia
- Phylum: Arthropoda
- Order: Protura
- Family: Acerentomidae
- Genus: Imadateiella
- Species: I. sphaerempodia

Binomial name
- Imadateiella sphaerempodia Yin, 1980

Species of insect-like animal

Imadateiella sphaerempodia is a species of proturan in the family Acerentomidae. It is found in Southern Asia.
