= Verrucoentomon mixtum =

Scientific classification
- Domain: Eukaryota
- Kingdom: Animalia
- Phylum: Arthropoda
- Order: Protura
- Family: Acerentomidae
- Genus: Verrucoentomon
- Species: V. mixtum

Binomial name
- Verrucoentomon mixtum Nosek, 1981

Species of insect-like animal

Verrucoentomon mixtum is a species of proturan in the family Acerentomidae. It is found in North America.
