= Madagascaridia xizangensis =

Scientific classification
- Domain: Eukaryota
- Kingdom: Animalia
- Phylum: Arthropoda
- Order: Protura
- Family: Acerentomidae
- Genus: Madagascaridia
- Species: M. xizangensis

Binomial name
- Madagascaridia xizangensis Yin, 1983

Species of insect-like animal

Madagascaridia xizangensis is a species of proturan in the family Acerentomidae. It is found in Southern Asia.
