= Kenyentulus kenyanus =

Scientific classification
- Kingdom: Animalia
- Phylum: Arthropoda
- Class: Entognatha
- Order: Protura
- Family: Acerentomidae
- Genus: Kenyentulus
- Species: K. kenyanus

Binomial name
- Kenyentulus kenyanus (Condé, 1948)

Species of insect-like animal

Kenyentulus kenyanus is a species of proturan in the family Acerentomidae. It is found in Africa, Australia, the Caribbean Sea, South America, and Southern Asia.
