= Baculentulus morikawai =

Scientific classification
- Domain: Eukaryota
- Kingdom: Animalia
- Phylum: Arthropoda
- Order: Protura
- Family: Acerentomidae
- Genus: Baculentulus
- Species: B. morikawai

Binomial name
- Baculentulus morikawai (Imadaté & Yosii, 1956)

Species of insect-like animal

Baculentulus morikawai is a species of proturan in the family Acerentomidae. It is found in Africa and Southern Asia.
