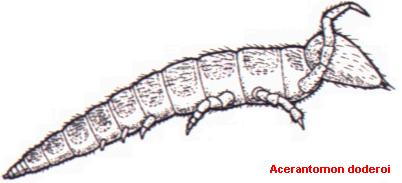
- Acerentomon doderoi

Scientific classification
- Kingdom: Animalia
- Phylum: Arthropoda
- Class: Entognatha
- Order: Protura
- Family: Acerentomidae
- Genus: Acerentomon; Silvestri, 1907

= Acerentomon =

Genus of insect-like animals

Acerentomon is a genus of proturans in the family Acerentomidae.

== Species ==
- Acerentomon aceris Rusek, 1965
- Acerentomon affine Bagnall, 1912
- Acerentomon album Loksa, 1966
- Acerentomon bagnalli Womersley, 1927
- Acerentomon balcanicum Ionesco, 1933
- Acerentomon baldense Torti, 1986
- Acerentomon brevisetosum Condé, 1945
- Acerentomon carpaticum Nosek, 1961
- Acerentomon condei Nosek & Dallai, 1982
- Acerentomon dispar Stach, 1954
- Acerentomon doderoi Silvestri, 1907
- Acerentomon dominiaki Szeptycki, 1977
- Acerentomon fageticola Rusek, 1966
- Acerentomon franzi Nosek, 1965
- Acerentomon gallicum Ionesco, 1933
- Acerentomon giganteum Condé, 1944
- Acerentomon granulatum Szeptycki, 1993
- Acerentomon hylophilum Rusek, 1966
- Acerentomon imadatei Nosek, 1967
- Acerentomon italicum Nosek, 1969
- Acerentomon kustorae Nosek, 1983
- Acerentomon maius Berlese, 1908
- Acerentomon meridionale Nosek, 1960
- Acerentomon mesorhinus Ionesco, 1930
- Acerentomon microrhinus Berlese, 1909
- Acerentomon nemorale Womersley, 1927
- Acerentomon noseki Torti, 1981
- Acerentomon novaki Rusek, 1965
- Acerentomon omissum Szeptycki, 1980
- Acerentomon oreophilon Szeptycki, 1980
- Acerentomon pannonicum Loksa, 1966
- Acerentomon parvum Szeptycki, 1980
- Acerentomon pseudomicrorhinus Nosek, 1977
- Acerentomon quercinum Ionesco, 1932
- Acerentomon robustum Ionesco, 1930
- Acerentomon rostratum Ionesco, 1951
- Acerentomon skuhravyi Rusek, 1965
- Acerentomon tenuisetosum Nosek, 1973
- Acerentomon tuxeni Nosek, 1961
