= Delamarentulus tristani =

Scientific classification
- Domain: Eukaryota
- Kingdom: Animalia
- Phylum: Arthropoda
- Order: Protura
- Family: Acerentomidae
- Genus: Delamarentulus
- Species: D. tristani

Binomial name
- Delamarentulus tristani (Silvestri, 1938)

Species of insect-like animal

Delamarentulus tristani is a species of proturan in the family Acerentomidae. It is found in Africa, the Caribbean Sea, Central America, and South America.
