= Paracerella americana =

Scientific classification
- Domain: Eukaryota
- Kingdom: Animalia
- Phylum: Arthropoda
- Order: Protura
- Family: Acerentomidae
- Genus: Paracerella
- Species: P. americana

Binomial name
- Paracerella americana Imadaté, 1980

Species of insect-like animal

Paracerella americana is a species of proturan in the family Acerentomidae. It is found in North America.
