= Acerentomon granulatum =

Scientific classification
- Domain: Eukaryota
- Kingdom: Animalia
- Phylum: Arthropoda
- Order: Protura
- Family: Acerentomidae
- Genus: Acerentomon
- Species: A. granulatum

Binomial name
- Acerentomon granulatum Szeptycki, 1993

Species of insect-like animal

Acerentomon granulatum is a species of proturan in the family Acerentomidae. It is found in Europe and Northern Asia (excluding China).
