= Baculentulus borealis =

Scientific classification
- Domain: Eukaryota
- Kingdom: Animalia
- Phylum: Arthropoda
- Order: Protura
- Family: Acerentomidae
- Genus: Baculentulus
- Species: B. borealis

Binomial name
- Baculentulus borealis Nakamura, 2004

Species of insect-like animal

Baculentulus borealis is a species of proturan in the family Acerentomidae. It is found in Europe and Northern Asia (excluding China).
