= Acerentomon gallicum =

Scientific classification
- Domain: Eukaryota
- Kingdom: Animalia
- Phylum: Arthropoda
- Order: Protura
- Family: Acerentomidae
- Genus: Acerentomon
- Species: A. gallicum

Binomial name
- Acerentomon gallicum Ionesco, 1933

Species of insect-like animal

Acerentomon gallicum is a species of proturan in the family Acerentomidae. It is found in Africa, Europe, and Northern Asia (excluding China).
