= Filientomon gentaroanum =

Scientific classification
- Kingdom: Animalia
- Phylum: Arthropoda
- Class: Entognatha
- Order: Protura
- Family: Acerentomidae
- Genus: Filientomon
- Species: F. gentaroanum

Binomial name
- Filientomon gentaroanum Nakamura, 2001

Species of insect-like animal

Filientomon gentaroanum is a species of proturan in the family Acerentomidae. It is found in Southern Asia.
