= Nipponentomon kamui =

Scientific classification
- Kingdom: Animalia
- Phylum: Arthropoda
- Class: Entognatha
- Order: Protura
- Family: Acerentomidae
- Genus: Nipponentomon
- Species: N. kamui

Binomial name
- Nipponentomon kamui Imadaté, 1965

Species of insect-like animal

Nipponentomon kamui is a species of proturan in the family Acerentomidae. It is found in Southern Asia.
