= Australentulus noseki =

Scientific classification
- Kingdom: Animalia
- Phylum: Arthropoda
- Class: Entognatha
- Order: Protura
- Family: Acerentomidae
- Genus: Australentulus
- Species: A. noseki

Binomial name
- Australentulus noseki Tuxen, 1967

Species of insect-like animal

Australentulus noseki is a species of proturan in the family Acerentomidae. It is found in Southern Asia.
