= Notentulus tropicus =

Scientific classification
- Domain: Eukaryota
- Kingdom: Animalia
- Phylum: Arthropoda
- Order: Protura
- Family: Acerentomidae
- Genus: Notentulus
- Species: N. tropicus

Binomial name
- Notentulus tropicus (Bonet, 1942)

Species of insect-like animal

Notentulus tropicus is a species of proturan in the family Acerentomidae. It is found in Central America.
