= Tuxenidia hermonensis =

Scientific classification
- Domain: Eukaryota
- Kingdom: Animalia
- Phylum: Arthropoda
- Order: Protura
- Family: Acerentomidae
- Genus: Tuxenidia
- Species: T. hermonensis

Binomial name
- Tuxenidia hermonensis Szeptycki & Broza, 2004

Species of insect-like animal

Tuxenidia hermonensis is a species of proturan in the family Acerentomidae. It is found in Europe and Northern Asia (excluding China).
