= Baculentulus bisetuli =

Scientific classification
- Domain: Eukaryota
- Kingdom: Animalia
- Phylum: Arthropoda
- Order: Protura
- Family: Acerentomidae
- Genus: Baculentulus
- Species: B. bisetuli

Binomial name
- Baculentulus bisetuli Yin, 1985

Species of insect-like animal

Baculentulus bisetuli is a species of proturan in the family Acerentomidae. It is found in Southern Asia.
