= Acerentomon imadatei =

Scientific classification
- Kingdom: Animalia
- Phylum: Arthropoda
- Class: Entognatha
- Order: Protura
- Family: Acerentomidae
- Genus: Acerentomon
- Species: A. imadatei

Binomial name
- Acerentomon imadatei Nosek, 1967

Species of insect-like animal

Acerentomon imadatei is a species of proturan in the family Acerentomidae. It is found in Europe and Northern Asia (excluding China).
