= Sugaentulus masumii =

Scientific classification
- Domain: Eukaryota
- Kingdom: Animalia
- Phylum: Arthropoda
- Order: Protura
- Family: Acerentomidae
- Genus: Sugaentulus
- Species: S. masumii

Binomial name
- Sugaentulus masumii Imadaté, 1978

Species of insect-like animal

Sugaentulus masumii is a species of proturan in the family Acerentomidae. It is found in Southern Asia.
