= Acerentomon robustum =

Scientific classification
- Domain: Eukaryota
- Kingdom: Animalia
- Phylum: Arthropoda
- Order: Protura
- Family: Acerentomidae
- Genus: Acerentomon
- Species: A. robustum

Binomial name
- Acerentomon robustum Ionesco, 1930

Species of insect-like animal

Acerentomon robustum is a species of proturan in the family Acerentomidae. It is found in Europe and Northern Asia (excluding China).
