= Gracilentulus aokii =

Scientific classification
- Domain: Eukaryota
- Kingdom: Animalia
- Phylum: Arthropoda
- Order: Protura
- Family: Acerentomidae
- Genus: Gracilentulus
- Species: G. aokii

Binomial name
- Gracilentulus aokii Imadaté, 1982

Species of insect-like animal

Gracilentulus aokii is a species of proturan in the family Acerentomidae. It is found in Southern Asia.
