= Gracilentulus maijiawensis =

Scientific classification
- Domain: Eukaryota
- Kingdom: Animalia
- Phylum: Arthropoda
- Order: Protura
- Family: Acerentomidae
- Genus: Gracilentulus
- Species: G. maijiawensis

Binomial name
- Gracilentulus maijiawensis Yin & Imadaté, 1979

Species of arthropod

Gracilentulus maijiawensis is a species of proturan in the family Acerentomidae. It is found in Southern Asia.
