= Amazonentulus brasilianus =

Scientific classification
- Domain: Eukaryota
- Kingdom: Animalia
- Phylum: Arthropoda
- Order: Protura
- Family: Acerentomidae
- Genus: Amazonentulus
- Species: A. brasilianus

Binomial name
- Amazonentulus brasilianus (Nosek, 1973)

Species of insect-like animal

Amazonentulus brasilianus is a species of proturan in the family Acerentomidae. It is found in South America.
