= Madagascaridia condei =

Scientific classification
- Domain: Eukaryota
- Kingdom: Animalia
- Phylum: Arthropoda
- Order: Protura
- Family: Acerentomidae
- Genus: Madagascaridia
- Species: M. condei

Binomial name
- Madagascaridia condei Nosek, 1978

Species of insect-like animal

Madagascaridia condei is a species of proturan in the family Acerentomidae. It is found in Africa.
