= Filientomon bipartitei =

Scientific classification
- Domain: Eukaryota
- Kingdom: Animalia
- Phylum: Arthropoda
- Order: Protura
- Family: Acerentomidae
- Genus: Filientomon
- Species: F. bipartitei

Binomial name
- Filientomon bipartitei Lee & Rim, 1988

Species of insect-like animal

Filientomon bipartitei is a species of proturan in the family Acerentomidae. It is found in Southern Asia.
