= Podolinella podolica =

Scientific classification
- Domain: Eukaryota
- Kingdom: Animalia
- Phylum: Arthropoda
- Order: Protura
- Family: Acerentomidae
- Genus: Podolinella
- Species: P. podolica

Binomial name
- Podolinella podolica Szeptycki, 1995

Species of insect-like animal

Podolinella podolica is a species of proturan in the family Acerentomidae. It is found in Europe and Northern Asia (excluding China).
