= Silvestridia solomonis =

Scientific classification
- Kingdom: Animalia
- Phylum: Arthropoda
- Class: Entognatha
- Order: Protura
- Family: Acerentomidae
- Genus: Silvestridia
- Species: S. solomonis

Binomial name
- Silvestridia solomonis (Imadaté, 1960)

Species of insect-like animal

Silvestridia solomonis is a species of proturan in the family Acerentomidae. It is found in Australia and Southern Asia.
