= Brasilidia nagaroorica =

Scientific classification
- Domain: Eukaryota
- Kingdom: Animalia
- Phylum: Arthropoda
- Order: Protura
- Family: Acerentomidae
- Genus: Brasilidia
- Species: B. nagaroorica

Binomial name
- Brasilidia nagaroorica Prabhoo, 1977

Species of insect-like animal

Brasilidia nagaroorica is a species of proturan in the family Acerentomidae. It is found in Southern Asia.
