= Gracilentulus shipingensis =

Scientific classification
- Domain: Eukaryota
- Kingdom: Animalia
- Phylum: Arthropoda
- Order: Protura
- Family: Acerentomidae
- Genus: Gracilentulus
- Species: G. shipingensis

Binomial name
- Gracilentulus shipingensis Yin, 1984

Species of insect-like animal

Gracilentulus shipingensis is a species of proturan in the family Acerentomidae. It is found in Southern Asia.
