= Orinentomon greenbergi =

Scientific classification
- Domain: Eukaryota
- Kingdom: Animalia
- Phylum: Arthropoda
- Order: Protura
- Family: Acerentomidae
- Genus: Orinentomon
- Species: O. greenbergi

Binomial name
- Orinentomon greenbergi (Nosek, 1980)

Species of insect-like animal

Orinentomon greenbergi is a species of proturan in the family Acerentomidae. It is found in North America.
