= Baculentulus breviunguis =

Scientific classification
- Kingdom: Animalia
- Phylum: Arthropoda
- Class: Entognatha
- Order: Protura
- Family: Acerentomidae
- Genus: Baculentulus
- Species: B. breviunguis

Binomial name
- Baculentulus breviunguis (Condé, 1961)

Species of insect-like animal

Baculentulus breviunguis is a species of proturan in the family Acerentomidae. It is found in Africa.
