= Acerentomon italicum =

Scientific classification
- Kingdom: Animalia
- Phylum: Arthropoda
- Clade: Pancrustacea
- Class: Entognatha
- Order: Protura
- Family: Acerentomidae
- Genus: Acerentomon
- Species: A. italicum

Binomial name
- Acerentomon italicum Nosek, 1969

Species of insect-like animal

Acerentomon italicum is a species of proturan in the family Acerentomidae. It is found in Europe & Northern Asia (excluding China).
