= Australentulus orientalis =

Scientific classification
- Domain: Eukaryota
- Kingdom: Animalia
- Phylum: Arthropoda
- Order: Protura
- Family: Acerentomidae
- Genus: Australentulus
- Species: A. orientalis

Binomial name
- Australentulus orientalis Prabhoo, 1972

Species of insect-like animal

Australentulus orientalis is a species of proturan in the family Acerentomidae. It is found in Southern Asia.
