= Tuxenentulus jilinensis =

Scientific classification
- Domain: Eukaryota
- Kingdom: Animalia
- Phylum: Arthropoda
- Order: Protura
- Family: Acerentomidae
- Genus: Tuxenentulus
- Species: T. jilinensis

Binomial name
- Tuxenentulus jilinensis Yin, 1984

Species of insect-like animal

Tuxenentulus jilinensis is a species of proturan in the family Acerentomidae. It is found in Southern Asia.
