= Silvestridia hutan =

Scientific classification
- Kingdom: Animalia
- Phylum: Arthropoda
- Class: Entognatha
- Order: Protura
- Family: Acerentomidae
- Genus: Silvestridia
- Species: S. hutan

Binomial name
- Silvestridia hutan Imadaté, 1965

Species of insect-like animal

Silvestridia hutan is a species of proturan in the family Acerentomidae. It is found in Africa.
