= Nipponentomon nippon =

Scientific classification
- Domain: Eukaryota
- Kingdom: Animalia
- Phylum: Arthropoda
- Order: Protura
- Family: Acerentomidae
- Genus: Nipponentomon
- Species: N. nippon

Binomial name
- Nipponentomon nippon (Yoshii, 1938)

Species of insect-like animal

Nipponentomon nippon is a species of proturan in the family Acerentomidae. It is found in Southern Asia.
