= Nipponentomon uenoi =

Scientific classification
- Domain: Eukaryota
- Kingdom: Animalia
- Phylum: Arthropoda
- Order: Protura
- Family: Acerentomidae
- Genus: Nipponentomon
- Species: N. uenoi

Binomial name
- Nipponentomon uenoi Imadaté & Yosii, 1959

Species of insect-like animal

Nipponentomon uenoi is a species of proturan in the family Acerentomidae. It is found in Southern Asia.

== Subspecies ==
These two subspecies belong to the species Nipponentomon uenoi:

- Nipponentomon uenoi paucisetosum ImadatÃ©, 1965
- Nipponentomon uenoi uenoi ImadatÃ© & Yosii, 1959
