= Imadateiella shideiana =

Scientific classification
- Domain: Eukaryota
- Kingdom: Animalia
- Phylum: Arthropoda
- Order: Protura
- Family: Acerentomidae
- Genus: Imadateiella
- Species: I. shideiana

Binomial name
- Imadateiella shideiana (Imadaté, 1964)

Species of insect-like animal

Imadateiella shideiana is a species of proturan in the family Acerentomidae. It is found in Southern Asia.

== Subspecies ==
These two subspecies belong to the species Imadateiella shideiana:

- Imadateiella shideiana eos (ImadatÃ©, 1974)
- Imadateiella shideiana shideiana (ImadatÃ©, 1964)
