= Orinentomon sinensis =

Scientific classification
- Domain: Eukaryota
- Kingdom: Animalia
- Phylum: Arthropoda
- Order: Protura
- Family: Acerentomidae
- Genus: Orinentomon
- Species: O. sinensis

Binomial name
- Orinentomon sinensis Yin & Xie, 1993

Species of insect-like animal

Orinentomon sinensis is a species of proturan in the family Acerentomidae. It is found in Southern Asia.
