= Amphientulus ambiguus =

Scientific classification
- Kingdom: Animalia
- Phylum: Arthropoda
- Class: Entognatha
- Order: Protura
- Family: Acerentomidae
- Genus: Amphientulus
- Species: A. ambiguus

Binomial name
- Amphientulus ambiguus (Tuxen, 1967)

Species of insect-like animal

Amphientulus ambiguus is a species of proturan in the family Acerentomidae. It is found in Australia.
