= Wenyingia =

Wenyingia is the scientific name of two genera of organisms and may refer to:

- Wenyingia (fungus), a genus of fungi in the family Pyronemataceae
- Wenyingia (proturan), a genus of arthropods in the family Acerentomidae
