= Acerentomon tuxeni =

Scientific classification
- Kingdom: Animalia
- Phylum: Arthropoda
- Class: Entognatha
- Order: Protura
- Family: Acerentomidae
- Genus: Acerentomon
- Species: A. tuxeni

Binomial name
- Acerentomon tuxeni Nosek, 1961

Species of insect-like animal

Acerentomon tuxeni is a species of proturan in the family Acerentomidae. It is found in Europe and Northern Asia (excluding China).
