= Silvestridia keijiana =

Scientific classification
- Kingdom: Animalia
- Phylum: Arthropoda
- Class: Entognatha
- Order: Protura
- Family: Acerentomidae
- Genus: Silvestridia
- Species: S. keijiana

Binomial name
- Silvestridia keijiana (Imadaté, 1965)

Species of insect-like animal

Silvestridia keijiana is a species of proturan in the family Acerentomidae. It is found in Australia and Southern Asia.
