= Baculentulus hohuanshanensis =

Scientific classification
- Domain: Eukaryota
- Kingdom: Animalia
- Phylum: Arthropoda
- Order: Protura
- Family: Acerentomidae
- Genus: Baculentulus
- Species: B. hohuanshanensis

Binomial name
- Baculentulus hohuanshanensis Chao, Lee & Chen, 1998

Species of insect-like animal

Baculentulus hohuanshanensis is a species of proturan in the family Acerentomidae. It is found in Southern Asia.
