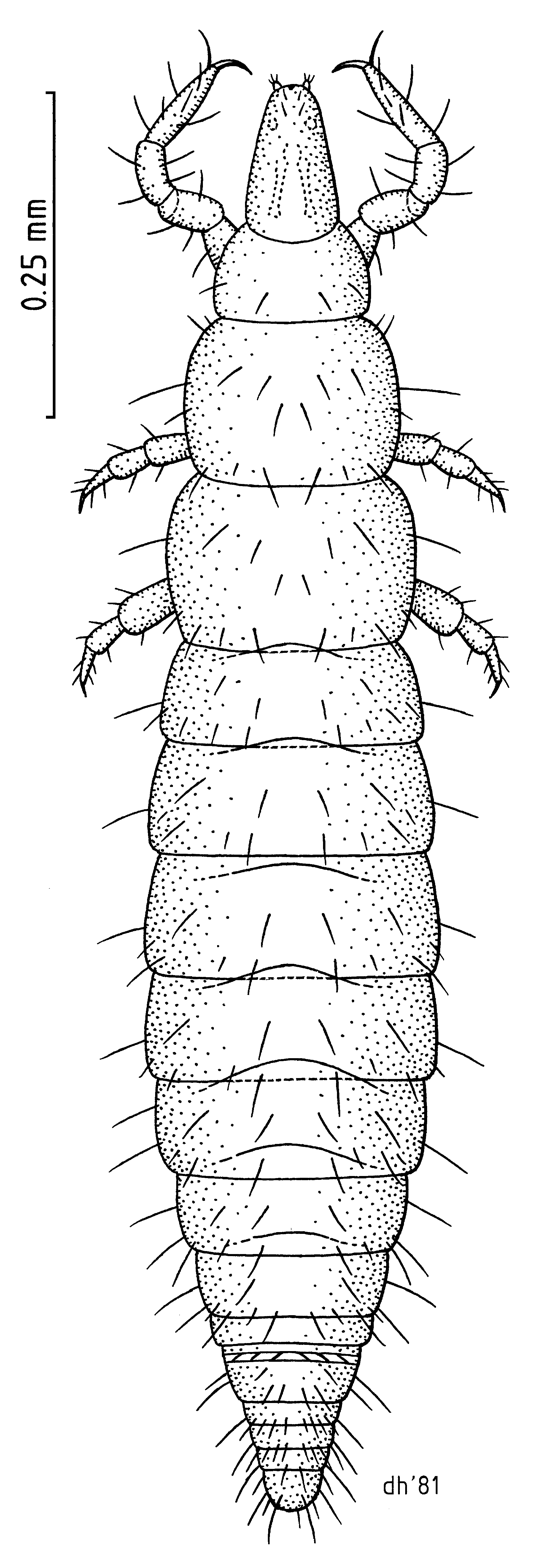

Scientific classification
- Domain: Eukaryota
- Kingdom: Animalia
- Phylum: Arthropoda
- Order: Protura
- Family: Acerentomidae
- Genus: Amphientulus
- Species: A. zelandicus

Binomial name
- Amphientulus zelandicus Tuxen, 1986

= Amphientulus zelandicus =

Species of insect-like animal

Amphientulus zelandicus is a species of proturan in the family Acerentomidae. It is found in Australia.
