= Alaskaentomon condei =

Scientific classification
- Domain: Eukaryota
- Kingdom: Animalia
- Phylum: Arthropoda
- Order: Protura
- Family: Acerentomidae
- Genus: Alaskaentomon
- Species: A. condei

Binomial name
- Alaskaentomon condei Nosek, 1981

Species of insect-like animal

Alaskaentomon condei is a species of proturan in the family Acerentomidae. It is found in North America.
