= Gracilentulus chichibuensis =

Scientific classification
- Domain: Eukaryota
- Kingdom: Animalia
- Phylum: Arthropoda
- Order: Protura
- Family: Acerentomidae
- Genus: Gracilentulus
- Species: G. chichibuensis

Binomial name
- Gracilentulus chichibuensis Nakamura, 1995

Species of insect-like animal

Gracilentulus chichibuensis is a species of proturan in the family Acerentomidae. It is found in Southern Asia.
