= Acerella muscorum =

Scientific classification
- Domain: Eukaryota
- Kingdom: Animalia
- Phylum: Arthropoda
- Order: Protura
- Family: Acerentomidae
- Genus: Acerella
- Species: A. muscorum

Binomial name
- Acerella muscorum (Ionesco, 1930)

Species of insect-like animal

Acerella muscorum is a species of proturan in the family Acerentomidae. It is found in Europe and Northern Asia (excluding China).
