= Verrucoentomon shirampa =

Scientific classification
- Domain: Eukaryota
- Kingdom: Animalia
- Phylum: Arthropoda
- Order: Protura
- Family: Acerentomidae
- Genus: Verrucoentomon
- Species: V. shirampa

Binomial name
- Verrucoentomon shirampa (Imadaté, 1964)

Species of insect-like animal

Verrucoentomon shirampa is a species of proturan in the family Acerentomidae. It is found in Southern Asia.
