= Australentulus indicus =

Scientific classification
- Domain: Eukaryota
- Kingdom: Animalia
- Phylum: Arthropoda
- Order: Protura
- Family: Acerentomidae
- Genus: Australentulus
- Species: A. indicus

Binomial name
- Australentulus indicus Prabhoo, 1972

Species of insect-like animal

Australentulus indicus is a species of proturan in the family Acerentomidae. It is found in Southern Asia.
