= Nosekiella danica =

Scientific classification
- Kingdom: Animalia
- Phylum: Arthropoda
- Class: Entognatha
- Order: Protura
- Family: Acerentomidae
- Genus: Nosekiella
- Species: N. danica

Binomial name
- Nosekiella danica (Condé, 1947)

Species of insect-like animal

Nosekiella danica is a species of proturan in the family Acerentomidae. It is found in Europe and Northern Asia (excluding China).
