= Nipponentomon aureitarsum =

Scientific classification
- Domain: Eukaryota
- Kingdom: Animalia
- Phylum: Arthropoda
- Order: Protura
- Family: Acerentomidae
- Genus: Nipponentomon
- Species: N. aureitarsum

Binomial name
- Nipponentomon aureitarsum (Ewing, 1940)

Species of insect-like animal

Nipponentomon aureitarsum is a species of proturan in the family Acerentomidae. It is found in North America.
