= Baculentulus nitidus =

Scientific classification
- Domain: Eukaryota
- Kingdom: Animalia
- Phylum: Arthropoda
- Order: Protura
- Family: Acerentomidae
- Genus: Baculentulus
- Species: B. nitidus

Binomial name
- Baculentulus nitidus (Imadaté & Yosii, 1959)

Species of insect-like animal

Baculentulus nitidus is a species of proturan in the family Acerentomidae. It is found in Southern Asia.
