= Brasilidia sanmartini =

Scientific classification
- Domain: Eukaryota
- Kingdom: Animalia
- Phylum: Arthropoda
- Order: Protura
- Family: Acerentomidae
- Genus: Brasilidia
- Species: B. sanmartini

Binomial name
- Brasilidia sanmartini Tuxen, 1984

Species of insect-like animal

Brasilidia sanmartini is a species of proturan in the family Acerentomidae. It is found in South America.
