= Gracilentulus sachikoae =

Scientific classification
- Kingdom: Animalia
- Phylum: Arthropoda
- Class: Entognatha
- Order: Protura
- Family: Acerentomidae
- Genus: Gracilentulus
- Species: G. sachikoae

Binomial name
- Gracilentulus sachikoae Imadaté, 1965

Species of insect-like animal

Gracilentulus sachikoae is a species of proturan in the family Acerentomidae. It is found in Southern Asia.
