= Nosekiella condei =

Scientific classification
- Domain: Eukaryota
- Kingdom: Animalia
- Phylum: Arthropoda
- Order: Protura
- Family: Acerentomidae
- Genus: Nosekiella
- Species: N. condei

Binomial name
- Nosekiella condei (Tuxen, 1955)

Species of insect-like animal

Nosekiella condei is a species of proturan in the family Acerentomidae. It is found in North America.
