= Verrucoentomon xinjiangense =

Scientific classification
- Domain: Eukaryota
- Kingdom: Animalia
- Phylum: Arthropoda
- Order: Protura
- Family: Acerentomidae
- Genus: Verrucoentomon
- Species: V. xinjiangense

Binomial name
- Verrucoentomon xinjiangense Yin, 1987

Species of insect-like animal

Verrucoentomon xinjiangense is a species of proturan in the family Acerentomidae. It is found in Southern Asia.
