= Kenyentulus imadatei =

Scientific classification
- Domain: Eukaryota
- Kingdom: Animalia
- Phylum: Arthropoda
- Order: Protura
- Family: Acerentomidae
- Genus: Kenyentulus
- Species: K. imadatei

Binomial name
- Kenyentulus imadatei Nakamura, 1997

Species of insect-like animal

Kenyentulus imadatei is a species of proturan in the family Acerentomidae. It is found in Southern Asia.
