= Gracilentulus gracilis =

Scientific classification
- Domain: Eukaryota
- Kingdom: Animalia
- Phylum: Arthropoda
- Order: Protura
- Family: Acerentomidae
- Genus: Gracilentulus
- Species: G. gracilis

Binomial name
- Gracilentulus gracilis (Berlese, 1908)

Species of insect-like animal

Gracilentulus gracilis is a species of proturan in the family Acerentomidae. It is found in Africa, Australia, Europe, and Northern Asia (excluding China).
