= Tuxenentulus ohbai =

Scientific classification
- Domain: Eukaryota
- Kingdom: Animalia
- Phylum: Arthropoda
- Order: Protura
- Family: Acerentomidae
- Genus: Tuxenentulus
- Species: T. ohbai

Binomial name
- Tuxenentulus ohbai Imadaté, 1974

Species of insect-like animal

Tuxenentulus ohbai is a species of proturan in the family Acerentomidae. It is found in Southern Asia.
