= Bolivaridia imadatei =

Scientific classification
- Domain: Eukaryota
- Kingdom: Animalia
- Phylum: Arthropoda
- Order: Protura
- Family: Acerentomidae
- Genus: Bolivaridia
- Species: B. imadatei

Binomial name
- Bolivaridia imadatei Prabhoo, 1975

Species of insect-like animal

Bolivaridia imadatei is a species of proturan in the family Acerentomidae. It is found in Southern Asia.
