= Kenyentulus sanjianus =

Scientific classification
- Kingdom: Animalia
- Phylum: Arthropoda
- Class: Entognatha
- Order: Protura
- Family: Acerentomidae
- Genus: Kenyentulus
- Species: K. sanjianus

Binomial name
- Kenyentulus sanjianus (Imadaté, 1965)

Species of insect-like animal

Kenyentulus sanjianus is a species of proturan in the family Acerentomidae. It is found in Southern Asia.
