= Acerentomon nemorale =

Scientific classification
- Domain: Eukaryota
- Kingdom: Animalia
- Phylum: Arthropoda
- Order: Protura
- Family: Acerentomidae
- Genus: Acerentomon
- Species: A. nemorale

Binomial name
- Acerentomon nemorale Womersley, 1927

Species of insect-like animal

Acerentomon nemorale is a species of proturan in the family Acerentomidae. It is found in Europe and Northern Asia (excluding China).
