= Kenyentulus datongensis =

Scientific classification
- Domain: Eukaryota
- Kingdom: Animalia
- Phylum: Arthropoda
- Order: Protura
- Family: Acerentomidae
- Genus: Kenyentulus
- Species: K. datongensis

Binomial name
- Kenyentulus datongensis Imadaté & Yin, 1983

Species of insect-like animal

Kenyentulus datongensis is a species of proturan in the family Acerentomidae. It is found in Southern Asia.
