= Noldo submontanus =

Scientific classification
- Domain: Eukaryota
- Kingdom: Animalia
- Phylum: Arthropoda
- Order: Protura
- Family: Acerentomidae
- Genus: Noldo
- Species: N. submontanus

Binomial name
- Noldo submontanus Szeptycki, 1988

Species of insect-like animal

Noldo submontanus is a species of proturan in the family Acerentomidae. It is found in Europe and Northern Asia (excluding China).
