= Silvestridia artiochaeta =

Scientific classification
- Domain: Eukaryota
- Kingdom: Animalia
- Phylum: Arthropoda
- Order: Protura
- Family: Acerentomidae
- Genus: Silvestridia
- Species: S. artiochaeta

Binomial name
- Silvestridia artiochaeta Bonet, 1942

Species of insect-like animal

Silvestridia artiochaeta is a species of proturan in the family Acerentomidae. It is found in Africa, Central America, and South America.
