= Proacerella reducta =

Scientific classification
- Domain: Eukaryota
- Kingdom: Animalia
- Phylum: Arthropoda
- Order: Protura
- Family: Acerentomidae
- Genus: Proacerella
- Species: P. reducta

Binomial name
- Proacerella reducta Bernard, 1976

Species of insect-like animal

Proacerella reducta is a species of proturan in the family Acerentomidae. It is found in North America.
