= Baculentulus becki =

Scientific classification
- Domain: Eukaryota
- Kingdom: Animalia
- Phylum: Arthropoda
- Order: Protura
- Family: Acerentomidae
- Genus: Baculentulus
- Species: B. becki

Binomial name
- Baculentulus becki (Tuxen, 1976)

Species of insect-like animal

Baculentulus becki is a species of proturan in the family Acerentomidae. It is found in South America.
