= Vesiculentomon marshalli =

Scientific classification
- Domain: Eukaryota
- Kingdom: Animalia
- Phylum: Arthropoda
- Order: Protura
- Family: Acerentomidae
- Genus: Vesiculentomon
- Species: V. marshalli

Binomial name
- Vesiculentomon marshalli Rusek, 1974

Species of insect-like animal

Vesiculentomon marshalli is a species of proturan in the family Acerentomidae. It is found in North America.
