= Australentulus phrachedee =

Scientific classification
- Domain: Eukaryota
- Kingdom: Animalia
- Phylum: Arthropoda
- Order: Protura
- Family: Acerentomidae
- Genus: Australentulus
- Species: A. phrachedee

Binomial name
- Australentulus phrachedee (Imadaté, 1965)

Species of insect-like animal

Australentulus phrachedee is a species of proturan in the family Acerentomidae. It is found in Southern Asia.
