= Callientomon chinensis =

Scientific classification
- Domain: Eukaryota
- Kingdom: Animalia
- Phylum: Arthropoda
- Order: Protura
- Family: Acerentomidae
- Genus: Callientomon
- Species: C. chinensis

Binomial name
- Callientomon chinensis Yin, 1980

Species of insect-like animal

Callientomon chinensis is a species of proturan in the family Acerentomidae.
