= Bolivaridia somalicum =

Scientific classification
- Domain: Eukaryota
- Kingdom: Animalia
- Phylum: Arthropoda
- Order: Protura
- Family: Acerentomidae
- Genus: Bolivaridia
- Species: B. somalicum

Binomial name
- Bolivaridia somalicum Yin & Dallai, 1985

Species of insect-like animal

Bolivaridia somalicum is a species of proturan in the family Acerentomidae. It is found in Africa.
