= Kenyentulus jianfengensis =

Scientific classification
- Domain: Eukaryota
- Kingdom: Animalia
- Phylum: Arthropoda
- Order: Protura
- Family: Acerentomidae
- Genus: Kenyentulus
- Species: K. jianfengensis

Binomial name
- Kenyentulus jianfengensis Yin, 1987

Species of insect-like animal

Kenyentulus jianfengensis is a species of proturan in the family Acerentomidae. It is found in Southern Asia.
