= Verrucoentomon aurifer =

Scientific classification
- Domain: Eukaryota
- Kingdom: Animalia
- Phylum: Arthropoda
- Order: Protura
- Family: Acerentomidae
- Genus: Verrucoentomon
- Species: V. aurifer

Binomial name
- Verrucoentomon aurifer Szeptycki, 1988

Species of insect-like animal

Verrucoentomon aurifer is a species of proturan in the family Acerentomidae. It is found in Europe and Northern Asia (excluding China).
