= Sugaentulus andrzeji =

Scientific classification
- Domain: Eukaryota
- Kingdom: Animalia
- Phylum: Arthropoda
- Order: Protura
- Family: Acerentomidae
- Genus: Sugaentulus
- Species: S. andrzeji

Binomial name
- Sugaentulus andrzeji Shrubovych & Rusek, 2010

Species of insect-like animal

Sugaentulus andrzeji is a species of proturan in the family Acerentomidae.
