= Alaskaentomon fjellbergi =

Scientific classification
- Domain: Eukaryota
- Kingdom: Animalia
- Phylum: Arthropoda
- Order: Protura
- Family: Acerentomidae
- Genus: Alaskaentomon
- Species: A. fjellbergi

Binomial name
- Alaskaentomon fjellbergi Nosek, 1977

Species of insect-like animal

Alaskaentomon fjellbergi is a species of proturan in the family Acerentomidae. It is found in North America.
