= Verrucoentomon yushuense =

Scientific classification
- Domain: Eukaryota
- Kingdom: Animalia
- Phylum: Arthropoda
- Order: Protura
- Family: Acerentomidae
- Genus: Verrucoentomon
- Species: V. yushuense

Binomial name
- Verrucoentomon yushuense Yin, 1980

Species of insect-like animal

Verrucoentomon yushuense is a species of proturan in the family Acerentomidae. It is found in Southern Asia.
