= Fjellbergella tuxeni =

Scientific classification
- Domain: Eukaryota
- Kingdom: Animalia
- Phylum: Arthropoda
- Order: Protura
- Family: Acerentomidae
- Genus: Fjellbergella
- Species: F. tuxeni

Binomial name
- Fjellbergella tuxeni Nosek, 1980

Species of insect-like animal

Fjellbergella tuxeni is a species of proturan in the family Acerentomidae. It is found in North America.
