= Bolivaridia boneti =

Scientific classification
- Domain: Eukaryota
- Kingdom: Animalia
- Phylum: Arthropoda
- Order: Protura
- Family: Acerentomidae
- Genus: Bolivaridia
- Species: B. boneti

Binomial name
- Bolivaridia boneti Tuxen, 1976

Species of insect-like animal

Bolivaridia boneti is a species of proturan in the family Acerentomidae. It is found in South America.
