= Nosekiella behanae =

Scientific classification
- Domain: Eukaryota
- Kingdom: Animalia
- Phylum: Arthropoda
- Order: Protura
- Family: Acerentomidae
- Genus: Nosekiella
- Species: N. behanae

Binomial name
- Nosekiella behanae Nosek, 1977

Species of insect-like animal

Nosekiella behanae is a species of proturan in the family Acerentomidae. It is found in North America.
