= Tuxenentulus boedvarssoni =

Scientific classification
- Domain: Eukaryota
- Kingdom: Animalia
- Phylum: Arthropoda
- Order: Protura
- Family: Acerentomidae
- Genus: Tuxenentulus
- Species: T. boedvarssoni

Binomial name
- Tuxenentulus boedvarssoni Nosek, 1981

Species of insect-like animal

Tuxenentulus boedvarssoni is a species of proturan in the family Acerentomidae. It is found in North America.
