= Noldo kaprusii =

Scientific classification
- Domain: Eukaryota
- Kingdom: Animalia
- Phylum: Arthropoda
- Order: Protura
- Family: Acerentomidae
- Genus: Noldo
- Species: N. kaprusii

Binomial name
- Noldo kaprusii Shrubovych & Szeptycki, 2006

Species of insect-like animal

Noldo kaprusii is a species of proturan in the family Acerentomidae. It is found in Europe and Northern Asia (excluding China).
