= Australentulus occidentalis =

Scientific classification
- Domain: Eukaryota
- Kingdom: Animalia
- Phylum: Arthropoda
- Order: Protura
- Family: Acerentomidae
- Genus: Australentulus
- Species: A. occidentalis

Binomial name
- Australentulus occidentalis (Womersley, 1932)

Species of insect-like animal

Australentulus occidentalis is a species of proturan in the family Acerentomidae. It is found in Australia.
