= Baculentulus macqueeni =

Scientific classification
- Domain: Eukaryota
- Kingdom: Animalia
- Phylum: Arthropoda
- Order: Protura
- Family: Acerentomidae
- Genus: Baculentulus
- Species: B. macqueeni

Binomial name
- Baculentulus macqueeni (Bernard, 1976)

Species of insect-like animal

Baculentulus macqueeni is a species of proturan in the family Acerentomidae. It is found in Africa and North America.
