= Kenyentulus condei =

Scientific classification
- Domain: Eukaryota
- Kingdom: Animalia
- Phylum: Arthropoda
- Order: Protura
- Family: Acerentomidae
- Genus: Kenyentulus
- Species: K. condei

Binomial name
- Kenyentulus condei (Prabhoo, 1975)

Species of insect-like animal

Kenyentulus condei is a species of proturan in the family Acerentomidae. It is found in Southern Asia.
