= Nipponentomon bidentatum =

Scientific classification
- Domain: Eukaryota
- Kingdom: Animalia
- Phylum: Arthropoda
- Order: Protura
- Family: Acerentomidae
- Genus: Nipponentomon
- Species: N. bidentatum

Binomial name
- Nipponentomon bidentatum Nakamura, 2004

Species of insect-like animal

Nipponentomon bidentatum is a species of proturan in the family Acerentomidae. It is found in Europe and Northern Asia (excluding China).
