= Tuxenentulus wuluensis =

Scientific classification
- Domain: Eukaryota
- Kingdom: Animalia
- Phylum: Arthropoda
- Order: Protura
- Family: Acerentomidae
- Genus: Tuxenentulus
- Species: T. wuluensis

Binomial name
- Tuxenentulus wuluensis Chao & Chen, 1999

Species of insect-like animal

Tuxenentulus wuluensis is a species of proturan in the family Acerentomidae. It is found in Southern Asia.
