= Brasilentulus africanus =

Scientific classification
- Domain: Eukaryota
- Kingdom: Animalia
- Phylum: Arthropoda
- Order: Protura
- Family: Acerentomidae
- Genus: Brasilentulus
- Species: B. africanus

Binomial name
- Brasilentulus africanus Tuxen, 1979

Species of insect-like animal

Brasilentulus africanus is a species of proturan in the family Acerentomidae. It is found in Africa.
