= Tuxenentulus rockyensis =

Scientific classification
- Domain: Eukaryota
- Kingdom: Animalia
- Phylum: Arthropoda
- Order: Protura
- Family: Acerentomidae
- Genus: Tuxenentulus
- Species: T. rockyensis

Binomial name
- Tuxenentulus rockyensis Imadaté, 1981

Species of insect-like animal

Tuxenentulus rockyensis is a species of proturan in the family Acerentomidae. It is found in North America.
