= Australentulus reginae =

Scientific classification
- Kingdom: Animalia
- Phylum: Arthropoda
- Class: Entognatha
- Order: Protura
- Family: Acerentomidae
- Genus: Australentulus
- Species: A. reginae

Binomial name
- Australentulus reginae Tuxen, 1967

Species of insect-like animal

Australentulus reginae is a species of proturan in the family Acerentomidae. It is found in Australia.
