= Delamarentulus barrai =

Scientific classification
- Domain: Eukaryota
- Kingdom: Animalia
- Phylum: Arthropoda
- Order: Protura
- Family: Acerentomidae
- Genus: Delamarentulus
- Species: D. barrai

Binomial name
- Delamarentulus barrai Tuxen, 1979

Species of insect-like animal

Delamarentulus barrai is a species of proturan in the family Acerentomidae. It is found in Africa.
