= Filientomon duodecimsetosum =

Scientific classification
- Domain: Eukaryota
- Kingdom: Animalia
- Phylum: Arthropoda
- Order: Protura
- Family: Acerentomidae
- Genus: Filientomon
- Species: F. duodecimsetosum

Binomial name
- Filientomon duodecimsetosum Nakamura, 2004

Species of insect-like animal

Filientomon duodecimsetosum is a species of proturan in the family Acerentomidae. It is found in Europe and Northern Asia (excluding China).
