= Yavanna (disambiguation) =

Yavanna is a fictional character in the works of author J. R. R. Tolkien.

Yavanna may also refer to:

- Yavanna (proturan), a genus of arthropod animals
- Yavanna (plant), an extinct genus of tree fern

== See also ==
- Yavana
