= Filientomon barberi =

Scientific classification
- Domain: Eukaryota
- Kingdom: Animalia
- Phylum: Arthropoda
- Order: Protura
- Family: Acerentomidae
- Genus: Filientomon
- Species: F. barberi

Binomial name
- Filientomon barberi (Ewing, 1921)

Species of insect-like animal

Filientomon barberi is a species of proturan in the family Acerentomidae. It is found in North America.
