= Tasmanentulus tasmanicus =

Scientific classification
- Kingdom: Animalia
- Phylum: Arthropoda
- Class: Entognatha
- Order: Protura
- Family: Acerentomidae
- Genus: Tasmanentulus
- Species: T. tasmanicus

Binomial name
- Tasmanentulus tasmanicus (Tuxen, 1967)

Species of insect-like animal

Tasmanentulus tasmanicus is a species of proturan in the family Acerentomidae. It is found in Australia.
