= Neobaculentulus heterotarsus =

Scientific classification
- Domain: Eukaryota
- Kingdom: Animalia
- Phylum: Arthropoda
- Order: Protura
- Family: Acerentomidae
- Genus: Neobaculentulus
- Species: N. heterotarsus

Binomial name
- Neobaculentulus heterotarsus Bu & Xie, 2006

Species of insect-like animal

Neobaculentulus heterotarsus is a species of proturan in the family Acerentomidae. It is found in Southern Asia.
