= Gracilentulus sardinianus =

Scientific classification
- Domain: Eukaryota
- Kingdom: Animalia
- Phylum: Arthropoda
- Order: Protura
- Family: Acerentomidae
- Genus: Gracilentulus
- Species: G. sardinianus

Binomial name
- Gracilentulus sardinianus Nosek, 1979

Species of insect-like animal

Gracilentulus sardinianus is a species of proturan in the family Acerentomidae. It is found in Europe and Northern Asia (excluding China).
