= Nosekiella urasi =

Scientific classification
- Domain: Eukaryota
- Kingdom: Animalia
- Phylum: Arthropoda
- Order: Protura
- Family: Acerentomidae
- Genus: Nosekiella
- Species: N. urasi

Binomial name
- Nosekiella urasi Imadaté, 1981

Species of insect-like animal

Nosekiella urasi is a species of proturan in the family Acerentomidae. It is found in Southern Asia.
