= Acerella remyi =

Scientific classification
- Kingdom: Animalia
- Phylum: Arthropoda
- Class: Entognatha
- Order: Protura
- Family: Acerentomidae
- Genus: Acerella
- Species: A. remyi

Binomial name
- Acerella remyi (Condé, 1944)

Species of insect-like animal

Acerella remyi is a species of proturan in the family Acerentomidae. It is found in Europe and Northern Asia (excluding China).
