= Bolivaridia perissochaeta =

Scientific classification
- Domain: Eukaryota
- Kingdom: Animalia
- Phylum: Arthropoda
- Order: Protura
- Family: Acerentomidae
- Genus: Bolivaridia
- Species: B. perissochaeta

Binomial name
- Bolivaridia perissochaeta Bonet, 1942

Species of insect-like animal

Bolivaridia perissochaeta is a species of proturan in the family Acerentomidae. It is found in the Caribbean Sea and Central America.
