= Australentulus ravenalensis =

Scientific classification
- Domain: Eukaryota
- Kingdom: Animalia
- Phylum: Arthropoda
- Order: Protura
- Family: Acerentomidae
- Genus: Australentulus
- Species: A. ravenalensis

Binomial name
- Australentulus ravenalensis François, 1994

Species of insect-like animal

Australentulus ravenalensis is a species of proturan in the family Acerentomidae. It is found in Africa.
