= Imadateiella shiria =

Scientific classification
- Domain: Eukaryota
- Kingdom: Animalia
- Phylum: Arthropoda
- Order: Protura
- Family: Acerentomidae
- Genus: Imadateiella
- Species: I. shiria

Binomial name
- Imadateiella shiria (Imadaté, 1964)

Species of insect-like animal

Imadateiella shiria is a species of proturan in the family Acerentomidae. It is found in Southern Asia.
