= Nosekiella hoogstraali =

Scientific classification
- Domain: Eukaryota
- Kingdom: Animalia
- Phylum: Arthropoda
- Order: Protura
- Family: Acerentomidae
- Genus: Nosekiella
- Species: N. hoogstraali

Binomial name
- Nosekiella hoogstraali Nosek, 1980

Species of insect-like animal

Nosekiella hoogstraali is a species of proturan in the family Acerentomidae. It is found in North America.
