= Australentulus delamarei =

Scientific classification
- Domain: Eukaryota
- Kingdom: Animalia
- Phylum: Arthropoda
- Order: Protura
- Family: Acerentomidae
- Genus: Australentulus
- Species: A. delamarei

Binomial name
- Australentulus delamarei Nosek, 1978

Species of insect-like animal

Australentulus delamarei is a species of proturan in the family Acerentomidae. It is found in Africa.
