= Neobaculentulus cipingensis =

Scientific classification
- Domain: Eukaryota
- Kingdom: Animalia
- Phylum: Arthropoda
- Order: Protura
- Family: Acerentomidae
- Genus: Neobaculentulus
- Species: N. cipingensis

Binomial name
- Neobaculentulus cipingensis Yin, 1987

Species of insect-like animal

Neobaculentulus cipingensis is a species of proturan in the family Acerentomidae. It is found in Southern Asia.
