= Brasilentulus huetheri =

Scientific classification
- Domain: Eukaryota
- Kingdom: Animalia
- Phylum: Arthropoda
- Order: Protura
- Family: Acerentomidae
- Genus: Brasilentulus
- Species: B. huetheri

Binomial name
- Brasilentulus huetheri Nosek, 1973

Species of insect-like animal

Brasilentulus huetheri is a species of proturan in the family Acerentomidae. It is found in South America.
