= Tasmanentulus intermedius =

Scientific classification
- Domain: Eukaryota
- Kingdom: Animalia
- Phylum: Arthropoda
- Order: Protura
- Family: Acerentomidae
- Genus: Tasmanentulus
- Species: T. intermedius

Binomial name
- Tasmanentulus intermedius Tuxen, 1986

Species of insect-like animal

Tasmanentulus intermedius is a species of proturan in the family Acerentomidae. It is found in Australia.
