= Amphientulus sinensis =

Scientific classification
- Domain: Eukaryota
- Kingdom: Animalia
- Phylum: Arthropoda
- Order: Protura
- Family: Acerentomidae
- Genus: Amphientulus
- Species: A. sinensis

Binomial name
- Amphientulus sinensis Xiong, Xie & Yin, 2005

Species of insect-like animal

Amphientulus sinensis is a species of proturan in the family Acerentomidae. It is found in Southern Asia.
