= Kenyentulus setosus =

Scientific classification
- Domain: Eukaryota
- Kingdom: Animalia
- Phylum: Arthropoda
- Order: Protura
- Family: Acerentomidae
- Genus: Kenyentulus
- Species: K. setosus

Binomial name
- Kenyentulus setosus S.o.Imadaté, 1992

Species of insect-like animal

Kenyentulus setosus is a species of proturan in the family Acerentomidae. It is found in Southern Asia.
