= Neobaculentulus izumi =

Scientific classification
- Kingdom: Animalia
- Phylum: Arthropoda
- Class: Entognatha
- Order: Protura
- Family: Acerentomidae
- Genus: Neobaculentulus
- Species: N. izumi

Binomial name
- Neobaculentulus izumi (Imadaté, 1965)

Species of insect-like animal

Neobaculentulus izumi is a species of proturan in the family Acerentomidae. It is found in Southern Asia.
