= Nipponentomon andrei =

Scientific classification
- Kingdom: Animalia
- Phylum: Arthropoda
- Class: Entognatha
- Order: Protura
- Family: Acerentomidae
- Genus: Nipponentomon
- Species: N. andrei

Binomial name
- Nipponentomon andrei (Ewing, 1940)

Species of insect-like animal

Nipponentomon andrei is a species of proturan in the family Acerentomidae. It is found in North America.
