= Verrucoentomon imadatei =

Scientific classification
- Kingdom: Animalia
- Phylum: Arthropoda
- Class: Entognatha
- Order: Protura
- Family: Acerentomidae
- Genus: Verrucoentomon
- Species: V. imadatei

Binomial name
- Verrucoentomon imadatei Nosek, 1977

Species of insect-like animal

Verrucoentomon imadatei is a species of proturan in the family Acerentomidae. It is found in North America.
