= Acerentomon giganteum =

Scientific classification
- Kingdom: Animalia
- Phylum: Arthropoda
- Class: Entognatha
- Order: Protura
- Family: Acerentomidae
- Genus: Acerentomon
- Species: A. giganteum

Binomial name
- Acerentomon giganteum Condé, 1944

Species of insect-like animal

Acerentomon giganteum is a species of proturan in the family Acerentomidae. It is found in Europe and Northern Asia (excluding China).
