= Tuxenidia =

Scientific classification
- Domain: Eukaryota
- Kingdom: Animalia
- Phylum: Arthropoda
- Order: Protura
- Family: Acerentomidae
- Genus: Tuxenidia; Nosek & Cvijovic, 1969

Genus of insect-like animals

Tuxenidia is a genus of proturans in the family Acerentomidae.

== Species ==
- Tuxenidia balcanica Nosek & Cvijovic, 1969
- Tuxenidia hermonensis Szeptycki & Broza, 2004
