= Alaskaentomon =

Scientific classification
- Domain: Eukaryota
- Kingdom: Animalia
- Phylum: Arthropoda
- Order: Protura
- Family: Acerentomidae
- Genus: Alaskaentomon; Nosek, 1977

Genus of insect-like animals

Alaskaentomon is a genus of proturans in the family Acerentomidae.

== Species ==
- Alaskaentomon condei Nosek, 1981
- Alaskaentomon fjellbergi Nosek, 1977
