= Zangentulus =

Scientific classification
- Kingdom: Animalia
- Phylum: Arthropoda
- Class: Entognatha
- Order: Protura
- Family: Acerentomidae
- Genus: Zangentulus; Yin, 1983

Genus of insect-like animals

Zangentulus is a genus of proturans in the family Acerentomidae.

== Species ==
- Zangentulus sinensis Yin, 1983
