= Proacerella =

Scientific classification
- Domain: Eukaryota
- Kingdom: Animalia
- Phylum: Arthropoda
- Order: Protura
- Family: Acerentomidae
- Genus: Proacerella; Bernard, 1975

Genus of insect-like animals

Proacerella is a genus of proturans in the family Acerentomidae.

== Species ==
- Proacerella reducta Bernard, 1975
- Proacerella vasconica Aldaba, 1983
