= Yinentulus =

Scientific classification
- Kingdom: Animalia
- Phylum: Arthropoda
- Class: Entognatha
- Order: Protura
- Family: Acerentomidae
- Genus: Yinentulus; Tuxen, 1986

Genus of insect-like animals

Yinentulus is a genus of proturans in the family Acerentomidae.

== Species ==
- Yinentulus paedocephalus Tuxen, 1986
