= Neobaculentulus =

Scientific classification
- Domain: Eukaryota
- Kingdom: Animalia
- Phylum: Arthropoda
- Order: Protura
- Family: Acerentomidae
- Genus: Neobaculentulus; Yin, 1984

Genus of insect-like animals

Neobaculentulus is a genus of proturans in the family Acerentomidae.

== Species ==
- Neobaculentulus cipingensis Yin, 1987
- Neobaculentulus henanensis Yin, 1984
- Neobaculentulus heterotarsus Bu & Xie, 2006
- Neobaculentulus izumi (Imadaté, 1965)
