= Imadateiella =

Scientific classification
- Domain: Eukaryota
- Kingdom: Animalia
- Phylum: Arthropoda
- Order: Protura
- Family: Acerentomidae
- Genus: Imadateiella; Rusek, 1974

Genus of insect-like animals

Imadateiella is a genus of proturans in the family Acerentomidae.

== Species ==
- Imadateiella murka Szeptycki, 1988
- Imadateiella saucrosi Yin, 1980
- Imadateiella shideiana (Imadaté, 1964)
- Imadateiella shiria (Imadaté, 1964)
- Imadateiella sphaerempodia Yin, 1980
- Imadateiella yosiiana Imadaté, 1961
