= Podolinella =

Scientific classification
- Kingdom: Animalia
- Phylum: Arthropoda
- Class: Entognatha
- Order: Protura
- Family: Acerentomidae
- Genus: Podolinella; Szeptycki, 1995

Genus of insect-like animals

Podolinella is a genus of proturans in the family Acerentomidae.

== Species ==
- Podolinella podolica Szeptycki, 1995
