= Yichunentulus =

Scientific classification
- Kingdom: Animalia
- Phylum: Arthropoda
- Class: Entognatha
- Order: Protura
- Family: Acerentomidae
- Genus: Yichunentulus; Yin, 1980

Genus of insect-like animals

Yichunentulus is a genus of proturans in the family Acerentomidae.

== Species ==
- Yichunentulus yichunensis Yin, 1980
