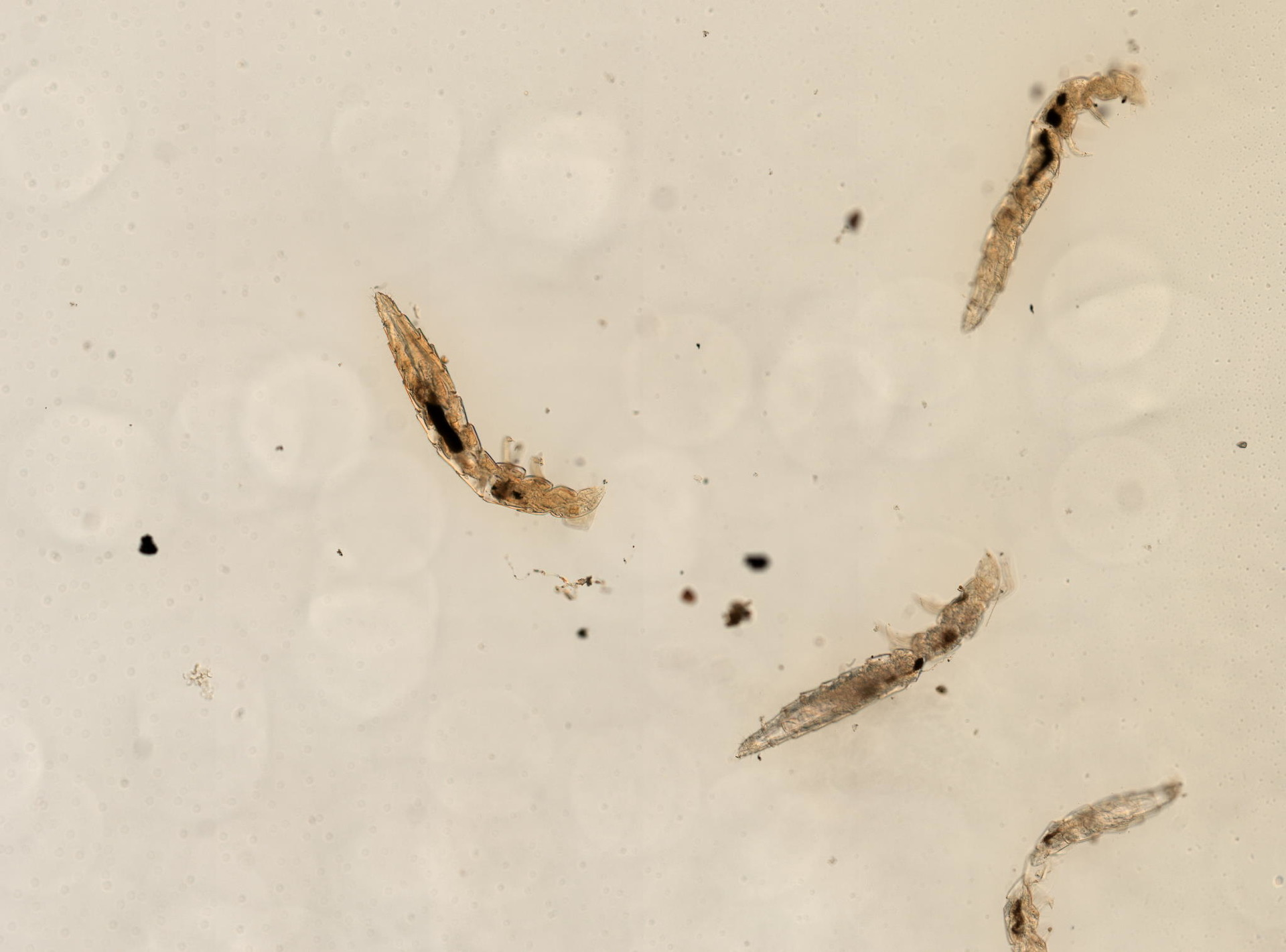

Scientific classification
- Kingdom: Animalia
- Phylum: Arthropoda
- Class: Entognatha
- Order: Protura
- Family: Acerentomidae
- Genus: Gracilentulus; Tuxen, 1963

= Gracilentulus =

Genus of insect-like animals

Gracilentulus is a genus of proturans in the family Acerentomidae.

== Species ==
- Gracilentulus americanus Szeptycki, 1993
- Gracilentulus aokii Imadaté, 1982
- Gracilentulus atlantidis Szeptycki, 1993
- Gracilentulus catulus Szeptycki, 1993
- Gracilentulus chichibuensis Nakamura, 1995
- Gracilentulus corsicanus Szeptycki, 1993
- Gracilentulus europeus Szeptycki, 1993
- Gracilentulus fjellbergi Szeptycki, 1993
- Gracilentulus flabelli Yin, 1985
- Gracilentulus floridanus Ewing, 1924
- Gracilentulus gracilis (Berlese, 1908)
- Gracilentulus hyleus Szeptycki, 1993
- Gracilentulus maijiawensis Yin & Imadaté, 1979
- Gracilentulus meridianus (Condé, 1945)
- Gracilentulus orousseti Szeptycki, 1993
- Gracilentulus sachikoae Imadaté, 1965
- Gracilentulus sardinianus Nosek, 1979
- Gracilentulus shipingensis Yin, 1984
