= Baculentulus =

Scientific classification
- Domain: Eukaryota
- Kingdom: Animalia
- Phylum: Arthropoda
- Order: Protura
- Family: Acerentomidae
- Genus: Baculentulus; Tuxen, 1977

Genus of insect-like animals

Baculentulus is a genus of proturans in the family Acerentomidae.

== Species ==
These 39 species belong to the genus Baculentulus:

- Baculentulus africanus (Nosek, 1976)
- Baculentulus becki (Tuxen, 1976)
- Baculentulus bisetuli Yin, 1985
- Baculentulus borealis Nakamura, 2004
- Baculentulus breviunguis (Condé, 1961)
- Baculentulus celisi (Condé, 1955)
- Baculentulus changchunensis Wu & Yin, 2008
- Baculentulus chiangmaiensis
- Baculentulus densus (Imadaté, 1960)
- Baculentulus duongkeoi (Imadaté, 1965)
- Baculentulus evansi (Condé, 1961)
- Baculentulus hohuanshanensis Chao, Lee & Chen, 1998
- Baculentulus krabbensis Bu, Potapov & Yin, 2014
- Baculentulus kulsarinae
- Baculentulus lanna (Imadaté, 1965)
- Baculentulus leptos Yin, 1985
- Baculentulus loxoglenus Yin, 1980
- Baculentulus macqueeni (Bernard, 1976)
- Baculentulus matsuokai (Imadaté, 1965)
- Baculentulus morikawai (Imadaté & Yosii, 1956)
- Baculentulus nipponicus Nakamura, 1985
- Baculentulus nitidus (Imadaté & Yosii, 1959)
- Baculentulus numatai (Imadaté, 1965)
- Baculentulus nyinabitabuensis (Condé, 1961)
- Baculentulus ogawai (Imadaté, 1965)
- Baculentulus oginoi (Imadaté, 1965)
- Baculentulus potapovi Shrubovych, 2010
- Baculentulus pseudonitidus (Tuxen & Imadaté, 1975)
- Baculentulus sakayorii Nakamura, 1995
- Baculentulus samchonri (Imadaté & Szeptycki, 1976)
- Baculentulus seychellensis Tuxen, 1978
- Baculentulus taipeiensis Chao, Lee & Chen, 1998
- Baculentulus tienmushanensis (Yin, 1963)
- Baculentulus tosanus (Imadaté & Yosii, 1959)
- Baculentulus tuxeni (Nosek & Hüther, 1974)
- Baculentulus umesaoi (Imadaté, 1965)
- Baculentulus weinerae Szeptycki & Imadaté, 1987
- Baculentulus yodai (Imadaté, 1965)
- Baculentulus yunnanensis Yin, 1985
