= Vesiculentomon =

Scientific classification
- Domain: Eukaryota
- Kingdom: Animalia
- Phylum: Arthropoda
- Order: Protura
- Family: Acerentomidae
- Genus: Vesiculentomon; Rusek, 1974

Genus of insect-like animals

Vesiculentomon is a genus of proturans in the family Acerentomidae.

== Species ==
- Vesiculentomon marshalli Rusek, 1974
- Vesiculentomon ruseki Nosek, 1977
