= Sugaentulus =

Scientific classification
- Domain: Eukaryota
- Kingdom: Animalia
- Phylum: Arthropoda
- Order: Protura
- Family: Acerentomidae
- Genus: Sugaentulus; Imadaté, 1978

Genus of insect-like animals

Sugaentulus is a genus of proturans in the family Acerentomidae.

== Species ==
- Sugaentulus andrzeji Shrubovych & Rusek, 2010
- Sugaentulus masumii Imadaté, 1978
