= Orinentomon =

Scientific classification
- Domain: Eukaryota
- Kingdom: Animalia
- Phylum: Arthropoda
- Order: Protura
- Family: Acerentomidae
- Genus: Orinentomon; Yin & Xie, 1993

Genus of insect-like animals

Orinentomon is a genus of proturans in the family Acerentomidae.

== Species ==
- Orinentomon greenbergi (Nosek, 1980)
- Orinentomon sinensis Yin & Xie, 1993
