= Chosonentulus =

Scientific classification
- Domain: Eukaryota
- Kingdom: Animalia
- Phylum: Arthropoda
- Order: Protura
- Family: Acerentomidae
- Genus: Chosonentulus; Imadaté & Szeptycki, 1976
- Species: C. chosonicus

Binomial name
- Chosonentulus chosonicus Imadaté & Szeptycki, 1976

Genus of insect-like animals

Chosonentulus is a genus of proturans in the family Acerentomidae. The only species is Chosonentulus chosonicus.
