= Notentulus =

Scientific classification
- Domain: Eukaryota
- Kingdom: Animalia
- Phylum: Arthropoda
- Order: Protura
- Family: Acerentomidae
- Genus: Notentulus; Yin, 1989

Genus of insect-like animals

Notentulus is a genus of proturans in the family Acerentomidae.

== Species ==
- Notentulus tropicus Bonet, 1942
- Notentulus zunynicus Yin, 1989
