= Berberentulus =

Scientific classification
- Domain: Eukaryota
- Kingdom: Animalia
- Phylum: Arthropoda
- Order: Protura
- Family: Acerentomidae
- Genus: Berberentulus; Tuxen, 1963

Genus of insect-like animals

Berberentulus is a genus of proturans in the family Acerentomidae.

== Species ==
- Berberentulus berberus (Condé, 1948)
- Berberentulus buchi Tuxen & Imadaté, 1975
- Berberentulus capensis (Womersley, 1931)
- Berberentulus huetheri Nosek, 1973
- Berberentulus huisunensis Chao & Chen, 1999
- Berberentulus neipuensis Chao & Chen, 1999
- Berberentulus nelsoni Tuxen, 1976
- Berberentulus polonicus Szeptycki, 1968
- Berberentulus rennelensis Tuxen & Imadaté, 1975
- Berberentulus tannae Tuxen, 1977
- Berberentulus travassosi (Silvestri, 1938)
