= Madagascaridia =

Scientific classification
- Domain: Eukaryota
- Kingdom: Animalia
- Phylum: Arthropoda
- Order: Protura
- Family: Acerentomidae
- Genus: Madagascaridia; Nosek, 1978

Genus of insect-like animals

Madagascaridia is a genus of proturans in the family Acerentomidae.

== Species ==
- Madagascaridia condei Nosek, 1978
- Madagascaridia xizangensis Yin, 1983
