= Maderentulus =

Scientific classification
- Domain: Eukaryota
- Kingdom: Animalia
- Phylum: Arthropoda
- Order: Protura
- Family: Acerentomidae
- Genus: Maderentulus; Tuxen, 1963

Genus of insect-like animals

Maderentulus is a genus of proturans in the family Acerentomidae.

== Species ==
- Maderentulus maderensis (Condé, 1957)
