= Tasmanentulus =

Scientific classification
- Domain: Eukaryota
- Kingdom: Animalia
- Phylum: Arthropoda
- Order: Protura
- Family: Acerentomidae
- Genus: Tasmanentulus; Tuxen, 1986

Genus of insect-like animals

Tasmanentulus is a genus of proturans in the family Acerentomidae.

== Species ==
- Tasmanentulus intermedius Tuxen, 1986
- Tasmanentulus similis (Tuxen, 1967)
- Tasmanentulus tasmanicus (Tuxen, 1967)
