= Fjellbergella =

Scientific classification
- Domain: Eukaryota
- Kingdom: Animalia
- Phylum: Arthropoda
- Order: Protura
- Family: Acerentomidae
- Genus: Fjellbergella; Nosek, 1978

Genus of insect-like animals

Fjellbergella is a genus of proturans in the family Acerentomidae.

== Species ==
- Fjellbergella lazovskiensis Bu, Potapov & Yin, 2014
- Fjellbergella tuxeni Nosek, 1978
