= Brasilentulus =

Scientific classification
- Domain: Eukaryota
- Kingdom: Animalia
- Phylum: Arthropoda
- Order: Protura
- Family: Acerentomidae
- Genus: Brasilentulus; Nosek, 1973

Genus of insect-like animals

Brasilentulus is a genus of proturans in the family Acerentomidae.

== Species ==
- Brasilentulus africanus Tuxen, 1979
- Brasilentulus huetheri Nosek, 1973
