= Yamatentomon =

Scientific classification
- Kingdom: Animalia
- Phylum: Arthropoda
- Class: Entognatha
- Order: Protura
- Family: Acerentomidae
- Genus: Yamatentomon; Imadaté, 1964

Genus of insect-like animals

Yamatentomon is a genus of proturans in the family Acerentomidae.

== Species ==
- Yamatentomon breviseta Szeptycki & Imadaté, 1987
- Yamatentomon fujisanum Imadaté, 1964
- Yamatentomon kunnepchupi Imadaté, 1964
- Yamatentomon kurosai Imadaté, 1974
- Yamatentomon yamato (Imadaté & Yosii, 1956)
