= Tuxenentulus =

Scientific classification
- Domain: Eukaryota
- Kingdom: Animalia
- Phylum: Arthropoda
- Order: Protura
- Family: Acerentomidae
- Genus: Tuxenentulus; Imadaté, 1974

Genus of insect-like animals

Tuxenentulus is a genus of proturans in the family Acerentomidae.

== Species ==
- Tuxenentulus boedvarssoni Nosek, 1981
- Tuxenentulus jilinensis Yin, 1984
- Tuxenentulus ohbai Imadaté, 1974
- Tuxenentulus rockyensis Imadaté, 1981
- Tuxenentulus wuluensis Chao & Chen, 1999
