= Filientomon =

Scientific classification
- Domain: Eukaryota
- Kingdom: Animalia
- Phylum: Arthropoda
- Order: Protura
- Family: Acerentomidae
- Genus: Filientomon; Rusek, 1974

Genus of insect-like animals

Filientomon is a genus of proturans in the family Acerentomidae.

== Species ==
- Filientomon barberi (Ewing, 1921)
- Filientomon bipartitei Lee & Rim, 1988
- Filientomon duodecimsetosum Nakamura, 2004
- Filientomon gentaroanum Nakamura, 2001
- Filientomon imadatei Lee & Rim, 1988
- Filientomon lubricum Imadaté, 1956
- Filientomon sibiricum Szeptycki, 1988
- Filientomon takanawanus (Imadaté, 1956)
