= Vindobonella =

Scientific classification
- Kingdom: Animalia
- Phylum: Arthropoda
- Class: Entognatha
- Order: Protura
- Family: Acerentomidae
- Genus: Vindobonella; Szeptycki & Christian, 2001

Genus of insect-like animals

Vindobonella is a genus of proturans in the family Acerentomidae.

== Species ==
- Vindobonella leopoldina Szeptycki & Christian, 2001
