= Verrucoentomon =

Scientific classification
- Domain: Eukaryota
- Kingdom: Animalia
- Phylum: Arthropoda
- Order: Protura
- Family: Acerentomidae
- Genus: Verrucoentomon; Rusek, 1974

Genus of insect-like animals

Verrucoentomon is a genus of proturans in the family Acerentomidae.

== Species ==
- Verrucoentomon aurifer Szeptycki, 1988
- Verrucoentomon canadensis (Tuxen, 1955)
- Verrucoentomon imadatei Nosek, 1977
- Verrucoentomon joannis Szeptycki, 1988
- Verrucoentomon kawakatsui (Imadaté, 1964)
- Verrucoentomon mixtum Nosek, 1981
- Verrucoentomon rafalskii Szeptycki, 1997
- Verrucoentomon shirampa (Imadaté, 1964)
- Verrucoentomon xinjiangense Yin, 1987
- Verrucoentomon yushuense Yin, 1980
