= Noldo =

Scientific classification
- Domain: Eukaryota
- Kingdom: Animalia
- Phylum: Arthropoda
- Order: Protura
- Family: Acerentomidae
- Genus: Noldo; Szeptycki, 1988

Genus of insect-like animals

Noldo is a genus of proturans in the family Acerentomidae.

== Species ==
- Noldo kaprusii Shrubovych & Szeptycki, 2006
- Noldo submontanus Szeptycki, 1988
