= Najtentulus =

Scientific classification
- Kingdom: Animalia
- Phylum: Arthropoda
- Class: Entognatha
- Order: Protura
- Family: Acerentomidae
- Genus: Najtentulus; Szeptycki & Weiner, 1997

Genus of insect-like animals

Najtentulus is a genus of proturans in the family Acerentomidae.

== Species ==
- Najtentulus silvestris Szeptycki & Weiner, 1997
