= Nosekiella =

Scientific classification
- Domain: Eukaryota
- Kingdom: Animalia
- Phylum: Arthropoda
- Order: Protura
- Family: Acerentomidae
- Genus: Nosekiella; Rusek, 1974

Genus of insect-like animals

Nosekiella is a genus of proturans in the family Acerentomidae.

== Species ==
- Nosekiella behanae Nosek, 1977
- Nosekiella condei (Tuxen, 1955)
- Nosekiella danica Condé, 1947
- Nosekiella hoogstraali Nosek, 1980
- Nosekiella urasi Imadaté, 1981
