= Gracilentulus catulus =

Scientific classification
- Domain: Eukaryota
- Kingdom: Animalia
- Phylum: Arthropoda
- Order: Protura
- Family: Acerentomidae
- Genus: Gracilentulus
- Species: G. catulus

Binomial name
- Gracilentulus catulus Szeptycki, 1993

Species of arthropods

Gracilentulus catulus is a species of proturan in the family Acerentomidae. It is found in Africa, Europe, and Northern Asia (excluding China).
