= Amazonentulus =

Scientific classification
- Domain: Eukaryota
- Kingdom: Animalia
- Phylum: Arthropoda
- Order: Protura
- Family: Acerentomidae
- Genus: Amazonentulus; Yin, 1989

Genus of insect-like animals

Amazonentulus is a genus of proturans in the family Acerentomidae.

== Species ==
- Amazonentulus amazonicus (Nosek, 1972)
- Amazonentulus brasilianus (Nosek, 1973)
- Amazonentulus hangmannarum (Tuxen, 1976)
- Amazonentulus ovei (Tuxen, 1976)
