= Acerentuloides =

Scientific classification
- Kingdom: Animalia
- Phylum: Arthropoda
- Class: Entognatha
- Order: Protura
- Family: Acerentomidae
- Genus: Acerentuloides; Ewing, 1921

Genus of insect-like animals

Acerentuloides is a genus of proturans in the family Acerentomidae, found in North America.

== Species ==
- Acerentuloides americanus Ewing, 1921
- Acerentuloides bernardi Shrubovych Starý & D'Haese, 2017
