= Kenyentulus =

Scientific classification
- Domain: Eukaryota
- Kingdom: Animalia
- Phylum: Arthropoda
- Order: Protura
- Family: Acerentomidae
- Genus: Kenyentulus; Tuxen, 1981

Genus of insect-like animals

Kenyentulus is a genus of proturans in the family Acerentomidae.

== Species ==
- Kenyentulus ailaoshanensis Yin, Xie, Zhang & Imadaté, 1995
- Kenyentulus anmashanus Chao, Lee & Chen, 1998
- Kenyentulus beibeiensis Tang & Yin, 1987
- Kenyentulus chongqingensis Tang & Yin, 1987
- Kenyentulus ciliciocalyci Yin, 1987
- Kenyentulus condei (Prabhoo, 1975)
- Kenyentulus daliensis Yin, Xie, Zhang & Imadaté, 1995
- Kenyentulus datongensis Imadaté & Yin, 1983
- Kenyentulus dolichadeni Yin, 1987
- Kenyentulus fanjingensis Yin, 1992
- Kenyentulus hainanensis Yin, 1987
- Kenyentulus hauseri Imadaté, 1991
- Kenyentulus henanensis Yin, 1983
- Kenyentulus hubeinicus Yin, 1987
- Kenyentulus imadatei Nakamura, 1997
- Kenyentulus japonicus (Imadaté, 1961)
- Kenyentulus jianfengensis Yin, 1987
- Kenyentulus jinghongensis Yin, 1983
- Kenyentulus jinjiangensis Tang & Yin, 1986
- Kenyentulus jiuzhaiensis Tang & Yin, 1986
- Kenyentulus kangdingensis Tang & Yin, 1987
- Kenyentulus kenyanus (Condé, 1948)
- Kenyentulus kunmingensis Yin, Xie, Zhang & Imadaté, 1995
- Kenyentulus malaysiensis (Imadaté, 1965)
- Kenyentulus medogensis Yin, 1983
- Kenyentulus menglunensis Yin, Xie, Zhang & Imadaté, 1995
- Kenyentulus minys Yin, 1983
- Kenyentulus monlongensis Yin, 1983
- Kenyentulus monticolus Nakamura, 1990
- Kenyentulus ohyamai (Imadaté, 1965)
- Kenyentulus sakimori (Imadaté, 1977)
- Kenyentulus sanjianus (Imadaté, 1965)
- Kenyentulus serdinensis Chao, Lee & Chen, 1998
- Kenyentulus setosus Imadaté & So, 1992
- Kenyentulus shennongjiensis Yin, 1987
- Kenyentulus xiaojinshanensis Yin, Xie, Zhang & Imadaté, 1995
- Kenyentulus xingshanensis Yin, 1987
- Kenyentulus yaanensis Tang & Yin, 1987
- Kenyentulus yayukae Imadaté, 1989
- Kenyentulus yinae Nakamura, 1997
