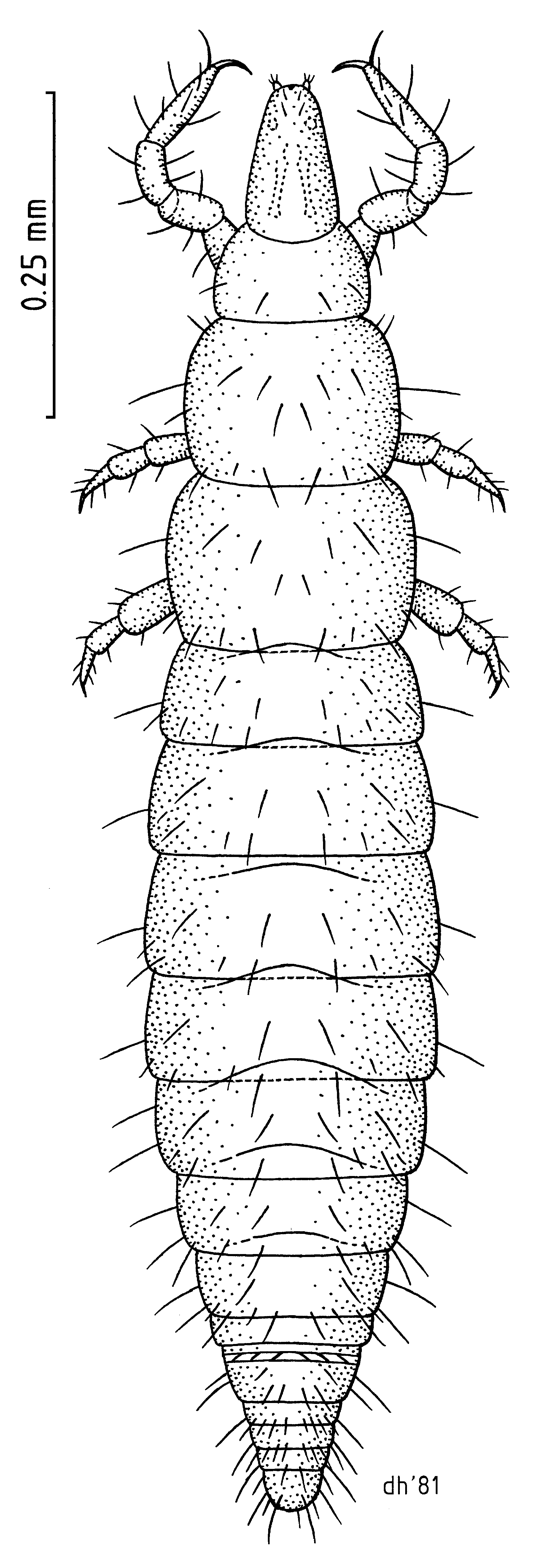
- Amphientulus zelandicus illustrated by Des Helmore

Scientific classification
- Domain: Eukaryota
- Kingdom: Animalia
- Phylum: Arthropoda
- Order: Protura
- Family: Acerentomidae
- Genus: Amphientulus; Tuxen, 1981

= Amphientulus =

Genus of insect-like animals

Amphientulus is a genus of proturans in the family Acerentomidae.

== Species ==
- Amphientulus aestuarii (Tuxen, 1967)
- Amphientulus alienus (Tuxen, 1967)
- Amphientulus ambiguus (Tuxen, 1967)
- Amphientulus durumagi (Imadaté, 1973)
- Amphientulus gnangarae (Tuxen, 1967)
- Amphientulus ruseki (Nosek, 1978)
- Amphientulus sinensis Xiong, Xie & Yin, 2005
- Amphientulus sinuosus (Tuxen, 1967)
- Amphientulus validus (Tuxen, 1967)
- Amphientulus zelandicus Tuxen, 1986
