= Bolivaridia =

Scientific classification
- Domain: Eukaryota
- Kingdom: Animalia
- Phylum: Arthropoda
- Order: Protura
- Family: Acerentomidae
- Genus: Bolivaridia; Fain & R. A. Norton, 1979

Genus of insect-like animals

Bolivaridia is a genus of proturans in the family Acerentomidae.

== Species ==
- Bolivaridia boneti Tuxen, 1976
- Bolivaridia imadatei Prabhoo, 1975
- Bolivaridia perissochaeta Bonet, 1942
- Bolivaridia somalicum Yin & Dallai, 1985
