= Nienna (proturan) =

Scientific classification
- Kingdom: Animalia
- Phylum: Arthropoda
- Clade: Pancrustacea
- Class: Entognatha
- Order: Protura
- Family: Acerentomidae
- Genus: Nienna; Szeptycki, 1988

Genus of insect-like animals

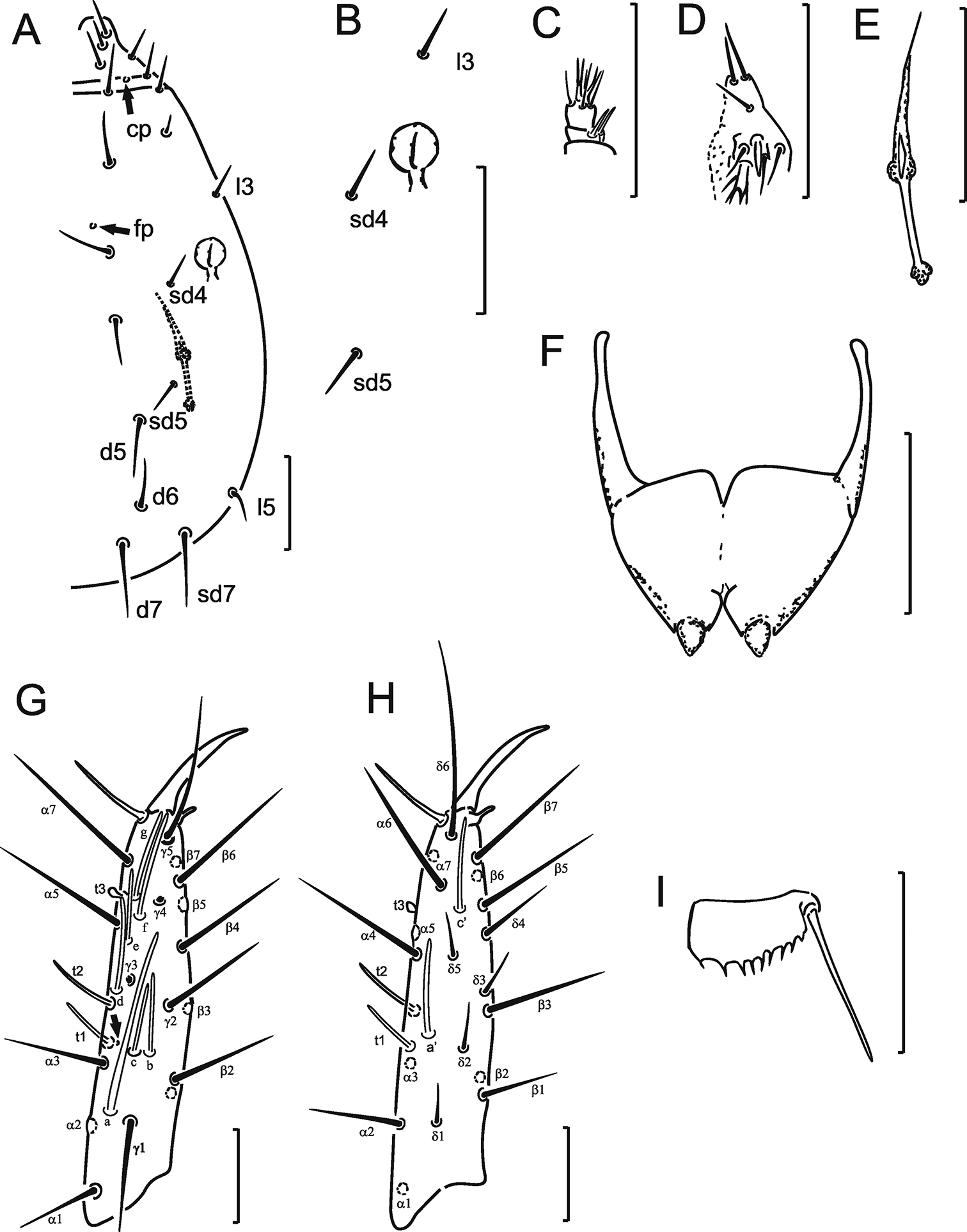
Scientific illustration of *Nienna chukotka*, holotype details relevant to the genus *Nienna*

Nienna is a genus of proturans in the family Acerentomidae.

== Species ==
- Nienna parvula Szeptycki, 1988
