= Delamarentulus =

Scientific classification
- Domain: Eukaryota
- Kingdom: Animalia
- Phylum: Arthropoda
- Order: Protura
- Family: Acerentomidae
- Genus: Delamarentulus; Tuxen, 1963

Genus of insect-like animals

Delamarentulus is a genus of proturans in the family Acerentomidae.

== Species ==
- Delamarentulus barrai Tuxen, 1979
- Delamarentulus pachychaetus Tuxen, 1979
- Delamarentulus tristani (Silvestri, 1938)
