= Silvestridia =

Scientific classification
- Domain: Eukaryota
- Kingdom: Animalia
- Phylum: Arthropoda
- Order: Protura
- Family: Acerentomidae
- Genus: Silvestridia; Bonet, 1942

Genus of insect-like animals

Silvestridia is a genus of proturans in the family Acerentomidae.

== Species ==
- Silvestridia africana Yin & Dallai, 1985
- Silvestridia artiochaeta Bonet, 1942
- Silvestridia hutan Imadaté, 1965
- Silvestridia keijiana Imadaté, 1965
- Silvestridia solomonis (Imadaté, 1960)
