= Paracerella =

Scientific classification
- Domain: Eukaryota
- Kingdom: Animalia
- Phylum: Arthropoda
- Order: Protura
- Family: Acerentomidae
- Genus: Paracerella; Imadaté, 1980

Genus of insect-like animals

Paracerella is a genus of proturans in the family Acerentomidae.

== Species ==
- Paracerella americana Imadaté, 1980
- Paracerella shirataki (Imadaté, 1964)
