= Andinentulus =

Scientific classification
- Kingdom: Animalia
- Phylum: Arthropoda
- Class: Entognatha
- Order: Protura
- Family: Acerentomidae
- Genus: Andinentulus; Tuxen, 1984
- Species: A. ebbei

Binomial name
- Andinentulus ebbei Tuxen, 1984

Genus of insect-like animals

Andinentulus is a genus of proturans in the family Acerentomidae. The only species is Andinentulus ebbei. It is found in South America.
