= Nipponentomon =

Scientific classification
- Domain: Eukaryota
- Kingdom: Animalia
- Phylum: Arthropoda
- Order: Protura
- Family: Acerentomidae
- Genus: Nipponentomon; Imadaté & Yosii, 1959

Genus of insect-like animals

Nipponentomon is a genus of proturans in the family Acerentomidae.

== Species ==
- Nipponentomon andrei (Ewing, 1940)
- Nipponentomon aureitarsum Ewing, 1940
- Nipponentomon bidentatum Nakamura, 2004
- Nipponentomon bifidum Rusek, 1974
- Nipponentomon californicum Hilton, 1929
- Nipponentomon heterothrici Yin & Xie, 1993
- Nipponentomon kamui Imadaté, 1965
- Nipponentomon kevani Rusek, 1974
- Nipponentomon khabarovskense Nakamura, 2004
- Nipponentomon macleani Nosek, 1977
- Nipponentomon nippon (Yosii, 1938)
- Nipponentomon uenoi Imadaté & Yosii, 1959
