= Australentulus =

Scientific classification
- Domain: Eukaryota
- Kingdom: Animalia
- Phylum: Arthropoda
- Order: Protura
- Family: Acerentomidae
- Genus: Australentulus; Tuxen, 1967

Genus of insect-like animals

Australentulus is a genus of proturans in the family Acerentomidae.

== Species ==
- Australentulus australiensis (Womersley, 1932)
- Australentulus betschi Nosek, 1978
- Australentulus dauphinense Nosek, 1978
- Australentulus delamarei Nosek, 1978
- Australentulus dituxeni Nosek, 1978
- Australentulus hauseri Nosek, 1976
- Australentulus indicus Prabhoo, 1972
- Australentulus intermedius Tuxen, 1967
- Australentulus noseki Tuxen, 1967
- Australentulus occidentalis (Womersley, 1932)
- Australentulus orientalis Prabhoo, 1972
- Australentulus phrachedee (Imadaté, 1965)
- Australentulus ravenalensis François, 1994
- Australentulus reginae Tuxen, 1967
- Australentulus tillyardi (Womersley, 1932)
- Australentulus tuxeni Prabhoo, 1975
- Australentulus victoriae Tuxen, 1967
- Australentulus westraliensis (Womersley, 1932)
