= Brasilidia =

Scientific classification
- Domain: Eukaryota
- Kingdom: Animalia
- Phylum: Arthropoda
- Order: Protura
- Family: Acerentomidae
- Genus: Brasilidia; Nosek, 1973

Genus of insect-like animals

Brasilidia is a genus of proturans in the family Acerentomidae.

== Species ==
- Brasilidia auleta Szeptycki & Bedano, 2003
- Brasilidia nagaroorica Prabhoo, 1977
- Brasilidia sanmartini Tuxen, 1984
- Brasilidia tropica Nosek, 1973
