= Acerella =

Scientific classification
- Domain: Eukaryota
- Kingdom: Animalia
- Phylum: Arthropoda
- Order: Protura
- Family: Acerentomidae
- Genus: Acerella; Berlese, 1909

Genus of arthropods

Acerella is a genus of proturans in the family Acerentomidae.

== Species ==
- Acerella filisensillatus (Gisin, 1945)
- Acerella montana Martynova, 1970
- Acerella muscorum (Ionesco, 1930)
- Acerella remyi (Condé, 1944)
- Acerella sharovi Martynova, 1977
- Acerella tiarnea Berlese, 1908
