= Yavanna altaica =

Scientific classification
- Kingdom: Animalia
- Phylum: Arthropoda
- Clade: Pancrustacea
- Class: Entognatha
- Order: Protura
- Family: Acerentomidae
- Genus: Yavanna; Szeptycki, 1988
- Species: Y. altaica

Binomial name
- Yavanna altaica Szeptycki, 1988

Genus of arthropods

Yavanna is a monotypic genus of proturans in the family Acerentomidae. The only species is Yavanna altaica.
