= Wenyingia (proturan) =

Weyningia

Scientific classification
- Kingdom: Animalia
- Phylum: Arthropoda
- Class: Entognatha
- Order: Protura
- Family: Acerentomidae
- Genus: Wenyingia; Imadaté, 1986

Genus of arthropods

Wenyingia is a genus of proturans in the family Acerentomidae.

== Species ==
- Wenyingia kurosawai (Imadaté, 1986)
