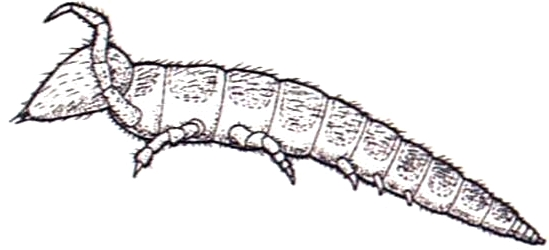
- Acerentomon doderoi

Scientific classification
- Domain: Eukaryota
- Kingdom: Animalia
- Phylum: Arthropoda
- Order: Protura
- Suborder: Acerentomata
- Family: Acerentomidae; Silvestri, 1907

Subfamilies
- Berberentulinae Yin, 1983; Acerentominae Silvestri, 1907; Nipponentominae Yin, 1983; Acerellinae Yin, 1983

= Acerentomidae =

Family of insect-like animals

The Acerentomidae are a family of hexapods in the order Protura. Acerentomids are not tracheated, and instead use cuticular gas exchange.

== Genera ==
These genera are members of the family Acerentomidae.

- Acerella Berlese, 1909
- Acerentomon Silvestri, 1907
- Acerentuloides Ewing, 1921
- Acerentulus Berlese, 1908
- Alaskaentomon Nosek, 1977
- Amazonentulus Yin, 1989
- Amphientulus Tuxen, 1981
- Andinentulus Tuxen, 1984
- Australentulus Tuxen, 1967
- Baculentulus Tuxen, 1977
- Berberentulus Tuxen, 1963
- Bolivaridia Bonet, 1942
- Brasilentulus Nosek, 1973
- Brasilidia Nosek, 1973
- Callientomon Yin, 1980
- Chosonentulus Imadaté & Szeptycki, 1976
- Delamarentulus Tuxen, 1963
- Filientomon Rusek, 1974
- Fjellbergella Nosek, 1978
- Gracilentulus Tuxen, 1963
- Huashanentulus Yin, 1980
- Imadateiella Rusek, 1974
- Kenyentulus Tuxen, 1981
- Liaoxientulus Wu & Yin, 2011
- Madagascaridia Nosek, 1978
- Maderentulus Tuxen, 1963
- Najtentulus Szeptycki & Weiner, 1997
- Nanshanentulus Bu & Yin, 2007
- Neobaculentulus Yin, 1984
- Nienna Szeptycki, 1988
- Nipponentomon Imadaté & Yosii, 1959
- Noldo Szeptycki, 1988
- Nosekiella Rusek, 1974
- Nosekientomon Shrubovych, Rusek & Bernard, 2014
- Notentulus Yin, 1989
- Orinentomon Yin & Xie, 1993
- Paracerella Imadaté, 1980
- Podolinella Szeptycki, 1995
- Polyadenum Yin, 1980
- Proacerella Bernard, 1975
- Silvestridia Bonet, 1942
- Sugaentulus Imadaté, 1978
- Tasmanentulus Tuxen, 1986
- Tuxenentulus Imadaté, 1974
- Tuxenidia Nosek & Cvijovic, 1969
- Verrucoentomon Rusek, 1974
- Vesiculentomon Rusek, 1974
- Vindobonella Szeptycki & Christian, 2001
- Wenyingia Imadaté, 1986
- Yamatentomon Imadaté, 1964
- Yavanna Szeptycki, 1988
- Yichunentulus Yin, 1980
- Yinentulus Tuxen, 1986
- Zangentulus Yin, 1983
