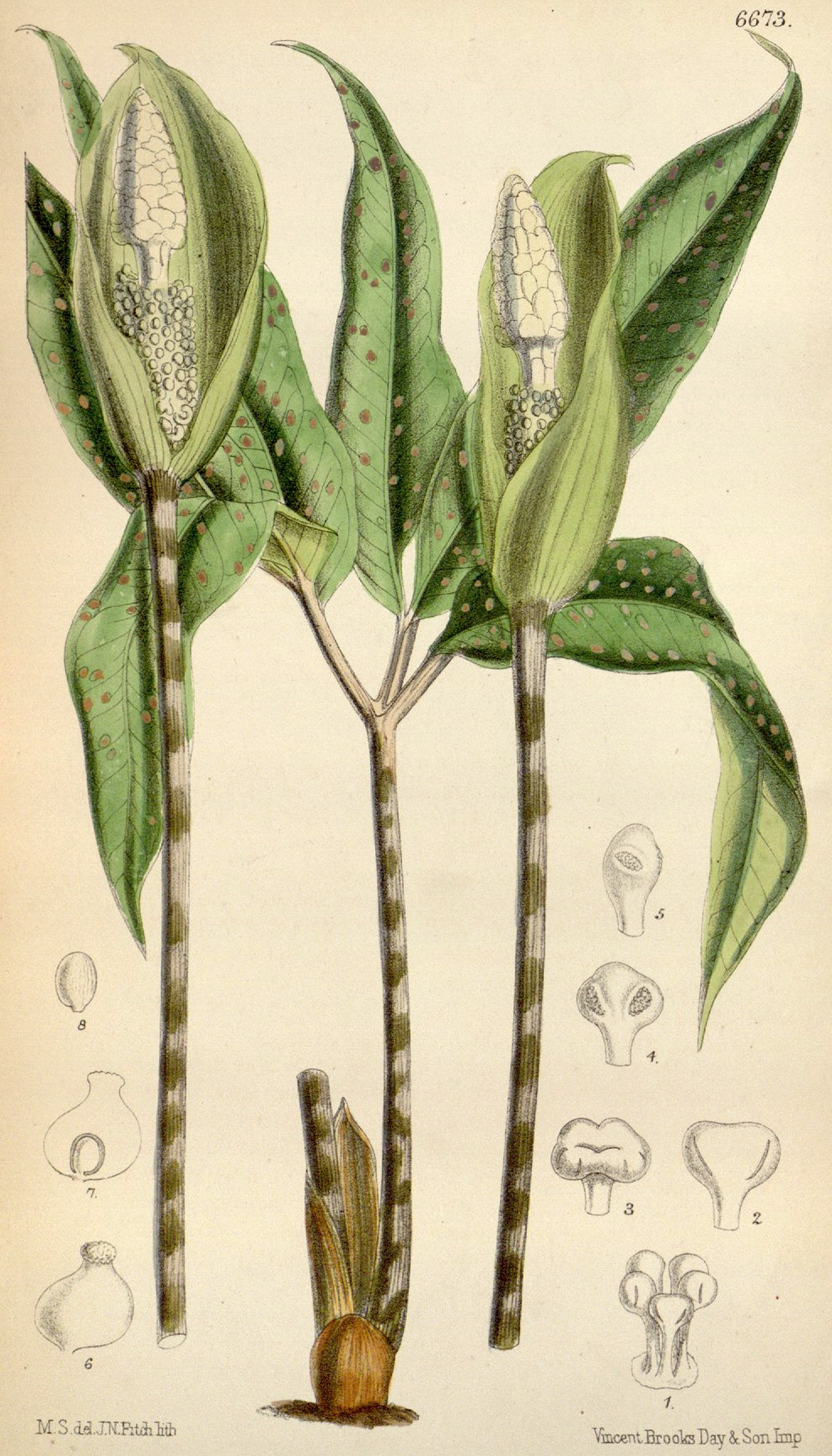
- botanical illustration of A. lacourii

Scientific classification
- Kingdom: Plantae
- Clade: Tracheophytes
- Clade: Angiosperms
- Clade: Monocots
- Order: Alismatales
- Family: Araceae
- Genus: Amorphophallus
- Species: A. lacourii

Binomial name
- Amorphophallus lacourii Linden & André

Synonyms
- Homotypic: Pseudodracontium lacourii (Linden & André) N.E.Br.; Heterotypic: Amorphophallus latifolius (Serebryanyi) Hett. & Claudel Pseudodracontium siamense Gagnep. Pseudodracontium anomalum N.E.Br. Pseudodracontium latifolium Serebryanyi

= Amorphophallus lacourii =

Species of plant

Amorphophallus lacourii is a species of flowering plant in the family Araceae and the monotypic tribe Thomsonieae. It is native to Cambodia, Laos, Thailand, and Vietnam.

It is still often known by its synonym Pseudodracontium lacourii, a consequence of Nicholas Edward Brown originally erecting the now obsolete genus Pseudodracontium.

The stem typically grows to about 0.5 m tall. In Vietnamese it is known as nưa bất thường.
