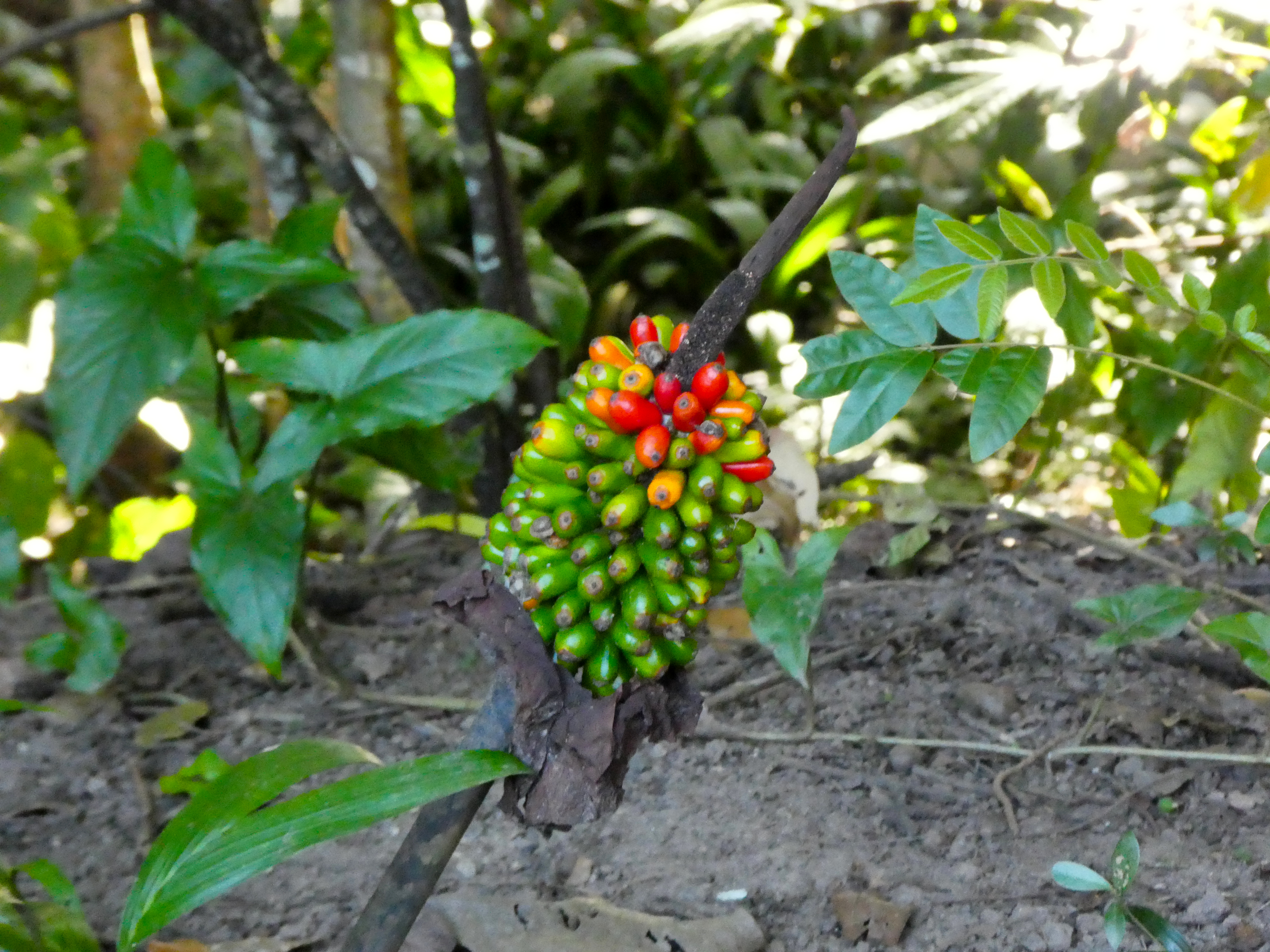
- Inflorescence

Conservation status
- Least Concern (NCA)

Scientific classification
- Kingdom: Plantae
- Clade: Tracheophytes
- Clade: Angiosperms
- Clade: Monocots
- Order: Alismatales
- Family: Araceae
- Genus: Amorphophallus
- Species: A. galbra

Binomial name
- Amorphophallus galbra F.M.Bailey

Synonyms
- Amorphophallus angustilobus F.M.Bailey; Amorphophallus glabra F.M.Bailey

= Amorphophallus galbra =

Cheeky yam

Species of flowering plant

Amorphophallus galbra, commonly known as cheeky yam or sweet snakeskin lily, is a perennial herbaceous plant in the arum family Araceae found in New Guinea and northern Australia (Western Australia, the Northern Territory and Queensland). It has an underground tuber which produces flower spikes and leaves in the wet season, which then die off during the dry season.

== Conservation ==
This species is listed as least concern under the Queensland Government's Nature Conservation Act. As of 7 August 2024, it has not been assessed by the International Union for Conservation of Nature (IUCN).
