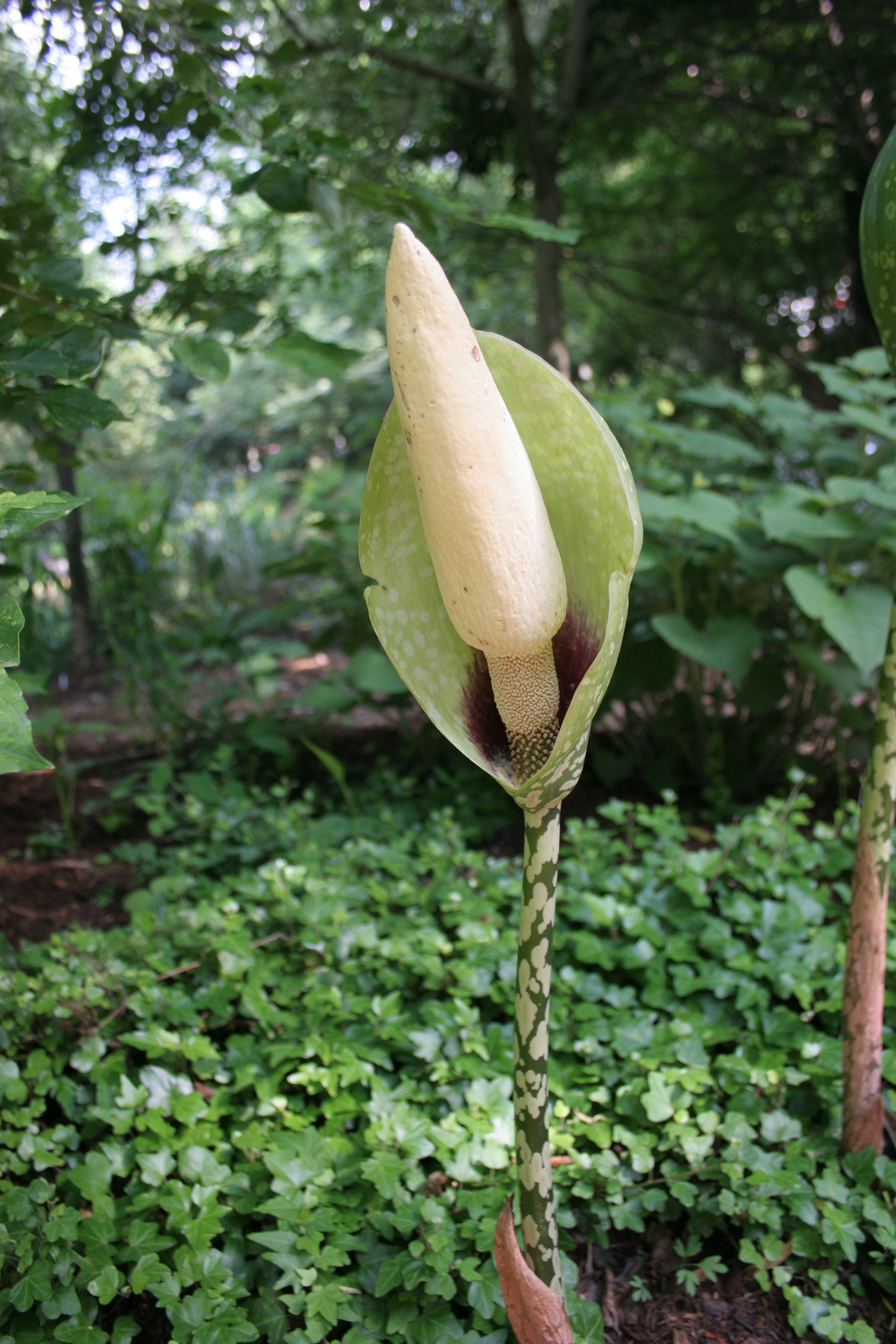

Scientific classification
- Kingdom: Plantae
- Clade: Tracheophytes
- Clade: Angiosperms
- Clade: Monocots
- Order: Alismatales
- Family: Araceae
- Genus: Amorphophallus
- Species: A. dunnii

Binomial name
- Amorphophallus dunnii Tutcher 1911

Synonyms
- Amorphophallus mellii Engler; Amorphophallus odoratus Hetterscheid & H.Li.

= Amorphophallus dunnii =

Species of flowering plant

Amorphophallus dunnii is a species of subtropical tuberous herbaceous plant found in Guangdong and Guangxi provinces of China.
