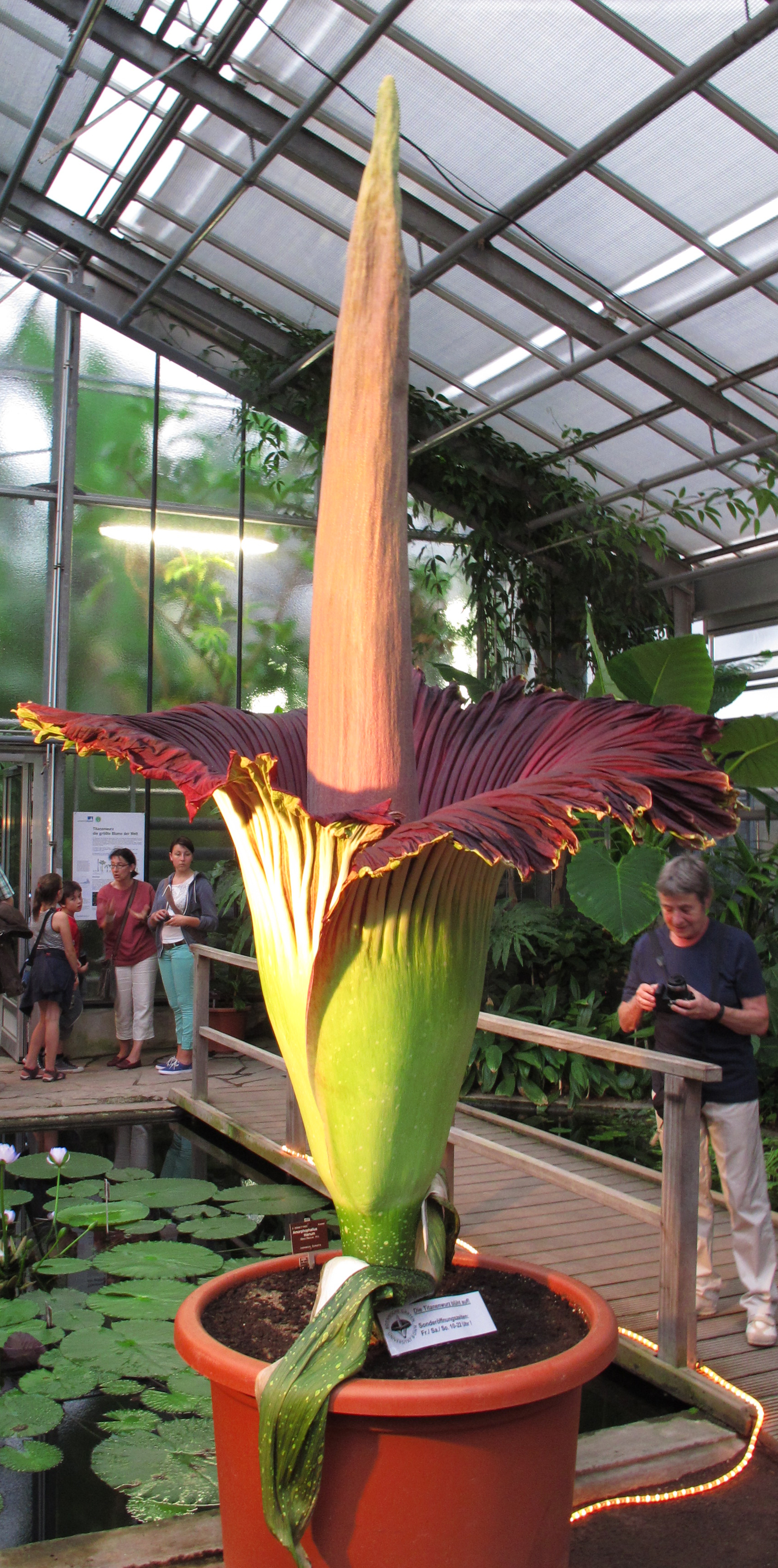
- Titan arum (Amorphophallus titanum) is the Amorphophallus with the largest unbranched inflorescence.

Scientific classification
- Kingdom: Plantae
- Clade: Embryophytes
- Clade: Tracheophytes
- Clade: Spermatophytes
- Clade: Angiosperms
- Clade: Monocots
- Order: Alismatales
- Family: Araceae
- Subfamily: Aroideae
- Tribe: Thomsonieae
- Genus: Amorphophallus; Blume ex Decne.

Type species
- Amorphophallus campanulatus Decne.

Species
- See text

Synonyms
- Allopythion Schott; Brachyspatha Schott; Candarum Schott; Conophallus Schott; Corynophallus Schott; Dunalia Montrouz.; Hansalia Schott; Hydrosme Schott; Kunda Raf.; Plesmonium Schott; Proteinophallus Hook.f.; Pseudodracontium N.E.Br.; Pythion Mart.; Pythonium Schott; Rhaphiophallus Schott; Synantherias Schott; Tapeinophallus Baill.; Thomsonia Wall.

= Amorphophallus =

Genus of flowering plants

Amorphophallus is a large genus of some 200 tropical and subtropical tuberous herbaceous plants from the arum family (Araceae), native to Asia, Africa, Australia and various oceanic islands. The genus includes the Titan arum (A. titanum) of Indonesia, which has the largest inflorescence in the genus, and is known as the 'corpse flower' for the pungent odour it produces during its flowering period, which can take up to seven years of growth before it occurs.

A few species are edible as "famine foods" after careful preparation to remove irritating chemicals.

== History ==
The oldest systematic record of the plants was in 1692, when Van Rheede tot Drakenstein published descriptions of two plants. The name "Amorphophallus" was first mentioned in 1834 by the Dutch botanist Blume from Ancient Greek αμορφος amorphos "without form, misshapen" and φαλλος phallos "penis", referring to the shape of the prominent spadix. Between 1876 and 1911, Adolf Engler merged a number of other genera into Amorphophallus, with a final monograph published in 1911.

== Distribution ==
These are typical lowland plants, growing in the tropical and subtropical zones of the paleotropics, from West Africa through the Pacific Islands. None of them are found in the Americas, although a remarkably similar but not closely related genus, Dracontium, has evolved there. Most species are endemic. They grow preferentially on disturbed grounds, such as secondary forests.

== Description ==
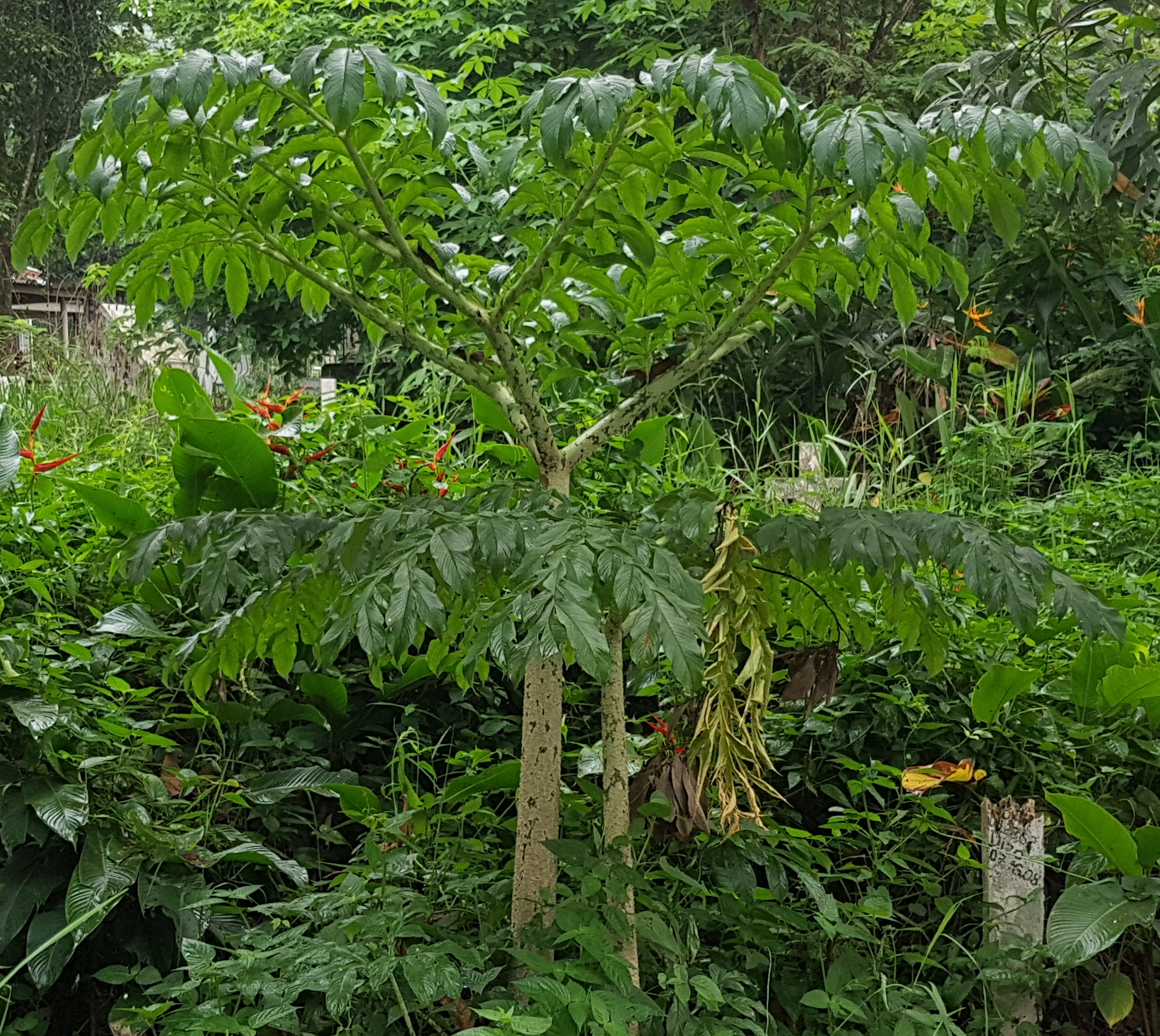
Amorphophallus paeoniifolius, the elephant foot yam, a species cultivated in the tropical Indo-Pacific for its edible tubers

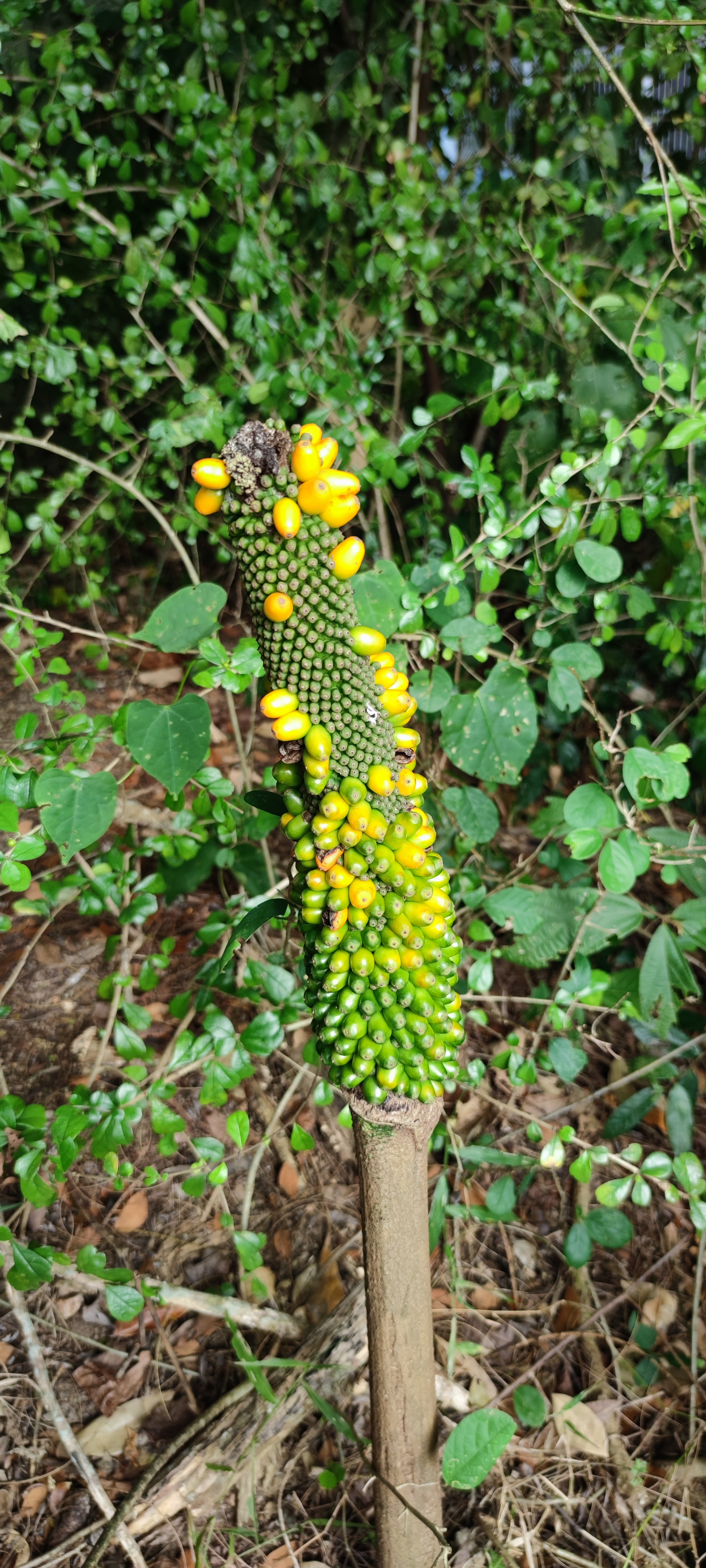
Amorphophallus infructescence with berry-like fruits

These small to massive plants grow from a subterranean tuber. Amorphophallus tubers vary greatly from species to species, from the quite uniformly globose tuber of A. konjac to the elongated tubers of A. longituberosus and A. macrorhizus to the bizarre clustered rootstock of A. coaetaneus. The weight of these tubers range from as little as 10 g (0.35 oz) in Amorphophallus pusillus of Vietnam to as much as 139 kg (306 lb) for Amorphophallus titanum. From the top of this tuber a single leaf, which can be several metres across in larger species, is produced atop a trunk-like petiole followed, on maturity, by a single inflorescence. This leaf consists of a vertical leaf stalk and a horizontal blade, which may consist of a number of small leaflets. The leaf lasts one growing season. The peduncle (the primary flower stalk) can be long or short.

As is typical of the Arum family, these species develop an inflorescence consisting of an elongate or ovate spathe (a sheathing bract) which usually envelops the spadix (a flower spike with a fleshy axis). The spathe can have different colours, but mostly brownish-purple or whitish-green. On the inside, they contain ridges or warts, functioning as insect traps.

The plants are monoecious. The spadix has tiny flowers: female flowers, no more than a pistil, at the bottom, then male flowers, each with one stamen, and then a blank sterile area. This last part, called 'the appendix', consists of sterile flowers, called staminodes, and can be especially large. The flowers do not have corollas.

Mature female flowers are usually receptive for only one day. In many species, the inflorescence emits a scent of decaying flesh in order to attract insects, though a number of species give off a pleasant odour. Through a number of ingenious insect traps, pollinating insects that entered a spathe when female flowers were receptive remain inside the spathe for about one day while male flowers mature and release pollen. Pollen falls on these insects, and they carry pollen as they exit the spathe and can pollinate female flowers in another spathe. Amorphophallus species are used as food plants by the larvae of some Lepidoptera (butterfly and moth) species including Palpifer sexnotatus and Palpifer sordida.

Pollinated flowers usually each develop into a globose berry, a fruit. The berries are red, orange-red, white, white and yellow, or blue, depending on the species.

=== Notable species ===
The species Amorphophallus titanum, 'corpse flower' or titan arum, has the world's largest unbranched inflorescence, with a height of up to 2.5 metres (8.2 ft) and a width of 1.5 metres (4.9 ft). After an over 1.2 metres (3.9 ft)-tall flower opened at Chicago Botanic Gardens on 29 September 2015, thousands lined up to see and smell it. The floriculturalist described it as smelling "like roadkill, a barnyard, a dirty diaper, very strong, a little bit of mothball smell too". Native to the Indonesian rainforest, it takes about 10 years to blossom. Dubbed "Alice", its bloom was broadcast via live webcam. It is one of two plants at the Chicago Botanic Gardens, which kept open until 2 am on September 30 to accommodate visitors.

A runner-up is Amorphophallus gigas, which is taller 4.36 m (14.3 ft) but has a somewhat smaller inflorescence.

Amorphophallus konjac tubers are used to make konnyaku (コンニャク), a Japanese thickening agent and edible jelly containing glucomannan.

Some species are called voodoo-lily, as are some species of Typhonium (also in the Araceae).

== Taxonomy and systematics ==
Amorphophallus Subgenera

- Amorphophallus
  - - - - - - Subgenus Scutrandrium
      - - - Subgenus Amorphophallus
    - Subgenus Metandrium
  - - Subgenus Afrophallus

The genus was divided into 4 subgenera based on phylogenetic analysis in 2017, with a number of SE Asian genera currently unplaced:

=== Subgenus Amorphophallus ===
Image	Name	Year	Distribution
	Amorphophallus adamsensis Magtoto, Mones, Ballada, Austria, R.M.Dizon, Alangui, Regina	2013	Philippines
	Amorphophallus angulatus Hett. & A.Vogel	1994	Borneo (Sarawak)
	Amorphophallus ardii Yuzammi & Hett.	2020	Sulawesi
	Amorphophallus asper (Engl.) Engl. & Gehrm.	1911	Sumatera
	Amorphophallus bangkokensis Gagnep.	1941	Thailand
	Amorphophallus beccarii Engl.	1880	Sumatera
	Amorphophallus borneensis (Engl.) Engl. & Gehrm.	1911	Borneo
	Amorphophallus boyceanus Hett.	2001	Thailand and Peninsular Malaysia
	Amorphophallus brachyphyllus Hett.	2001	Borneo (Kuching)
	Amorphophallus bufo Ridl.	1909	Malaysia
	Amorphophallus calcicolus Tamayo MN, Magtoto LM, Sumalinog MS, Reyes TD, Austria CM	2021	Philippines
	Amorphophallus caudatus Bustamante et al.	2020	Philippines
	Amorphophallus cidarioides J.R.Callado, Medecilo & Hett.	2020	Philippines
	Amorphophallus commutatus (Schott) Engl.	1879	Western India
	Amorphophallus costatus Hett.	1994	Borneo (Sarawak, Kalimantan)
	Amorphophallus declinatus Hett.	1994	Philippines
	Amorphophallus decus-silvae Backer & Alderw. : West-Java giant amorphophallus	1863	Java
	Amorphophallus discophorusBacker & Alderw.	1920	Java
	Amorphophallus eburneus Bogner	1989	Borneo (Sarawak)
	Amorphophallus elegans Ridl.	1922	Peninsular Malaysia
	Amorphophallus flammeus Calaramo, Batuyong, Bulawin & Alejandro	2022	Philippines
	Amorphophallus fontarumii N F. Bulawin, M P. Medecilo-Guiang, Grecebio J. D. Alejandro	2022	Philippines (Luzon)
	Amorphophallus forbesii (Engl.) Engl. & Gehrm.	1911	Sumatra
	Amorphophallus fornicatus Hett., J.R.C.Callado & Wistuba	2020	Philippines (Luzon)
	Amorphophallus galbraF.M.Bailey	1893	New Guinea to N. Australia
	Amorphophallus gigas Teijsm. & Binn.: Sumatra giant amorphophallus	1862	Sumatra
	Amorphophallus hewittii Alderw.	1920	Borneo
	Amorphophallus hirsutus Teijsm. & Binn.	1862	Nicobar Islands, W. Sumatra
	Amorphophallus hottae Bogner & Hett.	1992	Borneo (Sabah, Sarawak)
	Amorphophallus infundibuliformis Hett., A.Dearden & A.Vogel	1994	Borneo
	Amorphophallus julaihii Ipor, Tawan & P.C.Boyce	2004	Borneo (Sarawak)
	Amorphophallus juliae P.C.Boyce & Hett.	2010	Borneo (Sarawak)
	Amorphophallus koratensis Gagnep.	1941	Cambodia, Laos, Thailand
	Amorphophallus lambii Mayo & Widjaja	1982	Borneo
	Amorphophallus linguiformis Hett.	1994	Borneo (Kalimantan)
	Amorphophallus longispathaceus Engl. & Gehrm.	1911	Philippines (Mindanao)
	Amorphophallus longistylus Kurz ex Hook.f.	1893	Andaman Islands.
	Amorphophallus luzoniensis Merr.	1915	Philippines (Luzon)
	Amorphophallus malkmus-husseinii A.Galloway, Prehsler & Claudel	2019	Laos
	Amorphophallus manta Hett. & Ittenbach	1994	Sumatra to Peninsula Malaysia
	Amorphophallus merrilliiK.Krause	1912	Philippines
	Amorphophallus minimus R.Bustam., C.Claudel & M.N.Tamay	2021	Philippines
	Amorphophallus minor Ridl.	1904	Peninsula Malaysia
	Amorphophallus myosuroides Hett. & A.Galloway	2006	Laos
	Amorphophallus niahensis P.C.Boyce & Hett.	2010	Borneo (Sarawak)
	Amorphophallus obovoideus Alderw.	1922	Sumatra
	Amorphophallus obscurus Hett. & Sizemore	2001	Thailand
	Amorphophallus ongsakulii Hett. & A.Galloway	2006	Laos
	Amorphophallus opertus Hett.	1994	Vietnam
	Amorphophallus paeoniifolius (Dennst.) Nicolson: Whitespot giant arum, elephant yam	1977	Andaman Island, Assam, Bangladesh, Borneo, Cambodia, China South-Central, China Southeast, East Himalaya, Hainan, India, Java, Laos, Lesser Sundas Is., Malaya, Maluku, Myanmar, New Guinea, Northern Territory, Philippines, Sri Lanka, Sulawesi, Sumatra, Taiwan, Thailand, Vietnam
	Amorphophallus palawanensis Bogner & Hett.	1992	Philippines
	Amorphophallus pendulus Bogner & Mayo: Brunei amorphophallus	1986	Borneo (Brunei, Sarawak)
	Amorphophallus plicatus Bok & H.J.Lam	1936	Sulawesi
	Amorphophallus polyanthus Hett. & Sizemore	2001	Thailand
	Amorphophallus prainii Hook.f.	1893	Laos, Malaya, Sumatera, Thailand
	Amorphophallus pulchellus Hett. & Schuit.	2013	Laos
	Amorphophallus pusillus Hett. & Serebryanyi	1994	Vietnam
	Amorphophallus ranchanensis Ipor, A.Simon & Meekiong	2007	Borneo (Sarawak)
	Amorphophallus rayongii Hett. & Medecilo	2020	Philippines
	Amorphophallus rostratus Hett.	1994	Vietnam
	Amorphophallus rugosus Hett. & A.Lamb	1994	Borneo (Sabah)
	Amorphophallus sagittarius Steenis	1953	Java
	Amorphophallus salmoneus Hett.	1994	Philippines
	Amorphophallus scaber Serebryanyi & Hett.	1994	Philippines
	Amorphophallus serrulatus Hett. & A.Galloway	2006	Thailand
	Amorphophallus spectabilis (Miq.) Engl.	1879	Java
	Amorphophallus sumawongii (Bogner) Bogner & Mayo	1985	Thailand
	Amorphophallus terrestris Hett. & Claudel	2012	Thailand
	Amorphophallus tinekeae Hett. & A.Vogel	2001	Borneo
	Amorphophallus titanum (Becc.) Becc. ex Arcang: Titan arum, krubi (largest flower structure on earth)	1879	Sumatra
	Amorphophallus urceolatus Hett., A.Galloway & Medecilo	2020	Philippines
	Amorphophallus variabilis Blume	1873	Jawa to Lesser Sunda Islands, Philippines
	Amorphophallus venustus Hett., A.Hay & Mood	2001	Borneo
	Amorphophallus verticillatus Hett.	1994	Vietnam
	Amorphophallus yaoi Hett., A.Galloway & Medecilo	2020	Philippines
	Amorphophallus samarensis Fontarum-Bulawin, Medecilo-Guiang & Alejandro.	2024	Philippines

=== Subgenus Scutrandrium Hett. & Claudel ===
Image	Name	Year	Distribution
	Amorphophallus albispathus Hett.	1994	Thailand
	Amorphophallus albus P.Y.Liu & J.F.Chen	1984	China (Sichuan, Yunnan).
	Amorphophallus annulifer Hett.	1994	Java
	Amorphophallus asterostigmatus Bogner & Hett.	1992	Thailand
	Amorphophallus bantae J.T.Scholten, D.W.Livingston & Sizemore	2024	Thailand (Sa Kaeo)
	Amorphophallus bognerianus Sivad. & Jaleel	2009	India (Arunachal Pradesh)
	Amorphophallus carneus Ridl.	1904	Malayasia, Thailand
	Amorphophallus chlorospathus Kurz ex Hook.f.	1893	India, Myanmar
	Amorphophallus coudercii (Bogner) Bogner	1985	Cambodia, Laos, Thailand and Vietnam
	Amorphophallus curvistylis Hett.	1994	Thailand
	Amorphophallus echinatus Bogner & Mayo	1985	Thailand
	Amorphophallus excentricus Hett.	1994	Thailand, Malaysia (Pulau Langkawi)
	Amorphophallus fallax (Serebryanyi) Hett. & Claudel	2012	Vietnam
	Amorphophallus flotoi (S.Y.Hu) Govaerts	2018	Cambodia, Laos, Thailand, Vietnam
	Amorphophallus fuscus Hett.	2006	Thailand
	Amorphophallus glaucophyllus Hett. & Serebryanyi	2006	Thailand
	Amorphophallus haematospadix Hook.f.	1893	Thailand, Malaysia (Pulau Langkawi)
	Amorphophallus hohenackeri (Schott) Engl. & Gehrm.	1911	India
	Amorphophallus kachinensis Engl. & Gehrm.	1911	China (Yunnan, Guangxi), Laos, Myanmar, Thailand
	Amorphophallus konjac K.Koch: Devil's tongue, elephant foot, elephant-yam, leopard palm, snake palm, umbrella arum, voodoo lily	1858	China (Yunnan)
	Amorphophallus khammouanensis A.Galloway	2015	Laos
	Amorphophallus krausei Engl.	1911	China (Yunnan), Laos, Myanmar, Thailand
	Amorphophallus kuznetsovii (Serebryanyi) Hett. & Claudel	2012	Vietnam
	Amorphophallus lacourii Linden & André	1878	Cambodia, Laos, Thailand, Vietnam
	Amorphophallus lanceolatus (Serebryanyi) Hett. & Claudel	2012	Vietnam
	Amorphophallus longituberosus (Engl.) Engl. & Gehrm.	1911	Bangladesh, Malaya, Thailand
	Amorphophallus macrophyllus (Gagnep. ex Serebryanyi) Hett. & Claudel	2012	Thailand, Vietnam
	Amorphophallus maxwellii Hett.	1994	Thailand
	Amorphophallus nicolsonianus Sivadasan	1986	India (Kerala)
	Amorphophallus napalensis (Wall.) Bogner & Mayo	1985	Bangladesh, Bhutan, Nepal, Myanmar, and India
	Amorphophallus purpurascens Kurz ex Hook.f.	1893	Myanmar
	Amorphophallus ravenii V.D.Nguyen & Hett.	2018	Laos
	Amorphophallus rhizomatosus Hett.	1994	Laos, Vietnam
	Amorphophallus saraburensis Gagnep.	1941	Thailand
	Amorphophallus schmidtiae Hett. & A.Galloway	2006	Laos
	Amorphophallus scutatus Hett. & T.C.Chapm.	2001	Thailand
	Amorphophallus smithsonianus Sivadasan	1989	India
	Amorphophallus tenuistylis Hett.	1994	Cambodia, Thailand
	Amorphophallus tenuispadix Hett.	1994	Thailand
	Amorphophallus wasa Naive, K.Z.Hein & Hett.	2022	Myanmar

=== Subgenus Metandrium Stapf. ===
Image	Name	Year	Distribution
	Amorphophallus aberrans Hett.	1994	Thailand
	Amorphophallus amygdaloides Hett. & Sizemore	2001	SW. Thailand
	Amorphophallus angustispathus Hett.	1994	Myanmar
	Amorphophallus atrorubens Hett. & Sizemore	2001	NE. Thailand
	Amorphophallus atroviridis Hett.	1994	central Thailand
	Amorphophallus bonaccordensis Sivad. & N.Mohanan	1994	Kerala
	Amorphophallus brevispathus Gagnep.	1941	Central Thailand
	Amorphophallus bulbifer (Schott) Blume	1837	Indian subcontinent to Myanmar
	Amorphophallus carnosus Engl.	1911	S. Andaman Islands
	Amorphophallus cicatricifer Hett.	1994	SW. Thailand
	Amorphophallus cirrifer Stapf	1924	Thailand
	Amorphophallus coaetaneus S.Y.Liu & S.J.Wei	1986	China (Yunnan, Guangxi), Vietnam
	Amorphophallus croatii Hett. & A.Galloway	2006	Laos
	Amorphophallus cruddasianus Prain	1898	Laos, Myanmar, Thailand
	Amorphophallus dunnii Tutcher	1911	SE. China
	Amorphophallus dzui Hett.	2001	Vietnam
	Amorphophallus elatus Hook.f.	1893	Thailand, Malaysia, Myanmar
	Amorphophallus gallowayi Hett.	2006	Laos
	Amorphophallus glossophyllus Hett.	1994	Vietnam
	Amorphophallus harmandii Engl. & Gehrm.	1911	Indochina
	Amorphophallus hayi Hett.	1994	SE China, northern Vietnam
	Amorphophallus henryi N.E.Br. (Taiwan amorphophallus)	1903	Taiwan
	Amorphophallus hirtus N.E.Br.	1903	Taiwan
	Amorphophallus interruptus Engl. & Gehrm.	1911	northern Vietnam
	Amorphophallus josefbogneri Hett.	2006	SW. Thailand
	Amorphophallus kiusianus (Makino) Makino	1913	SE. China, Japan (Shikoku, S. Kyushu) to Taiwan
	Amorphophallus konkanensis Hett., S.R.Yadav & K.S.Patil	1994	India
	Amorphophallus lanuginosus Hett.	1994	Vietnam
	Amorphophallus laoticus Hett.	2006	Laos
	Amorphophallus linearis Gagnep.	1941	Thailand
	Amorphophallus longicomus Hett. & Serebryanyi	2001	Vietnam
	Amorphophallus longiconnectivus Bogner	1995	India (Madhya Pradesh, Maharashtra)
	Amorphophallus lunatus Hett. & Sizemore	2006	Thailand
	Amorphophallus macrorhizus Craib	1912	Thailand
	Amorphophallus margaritifer (Roxb.) Kunth	1837	Assam, Bangladesh, East Himalaya, India, Myanmar
	Amorphophallus mirabilis K.Z.Hein, Naive, Serebryanyi & Hett.	2023	Myanmar
	Amorphophallus muelleri Blume	1837	Assam, Borneo, Jawa, Lesser Sunda Is., Myanmar, Sumatera, Thailand
	Amorphophallus mysorensis E.Barnes & C.E.C.Fisch.	1940	India
	Amorphophallus napiger Gagnep.	1941	Cambodia, Laos, Thailand, Vietnam
	Amorphophallus natolii Hett., Wistuba, V.B.Amoroso, Medecilo & Claudel	2012	Philippines
	Amorphophallus ochroleucus Hett. & V.D.Nguyen	2001	Vietnam
	Amorphophallus oncophyllus Prain ex Hook.f.	1893	Andaman Islands (Coco Islands)
	Amorphophallus operculatus Hett. & Sizemore	2003	Thailand
	Amorphophallus pilosus Hett.	1994	Vietnam
	Amorphophallus prolificus Hett. & A.Galloway	2006	Thailand
	Amorphophallus putii Gagnep.	1941	Myanmar, Thailand
	Amorphophallus pygmaeus Hett.	1994	Thailand
	Amorphophallus reflexus Hett. & A.Galloway	2006	Thailand
	Amorphophallus sakonnakhonensis Chatan & Promprom	2023	Thailand
	Amorphophallus saururus Hett.	2001	Thailand
	Amorphophallus shyamsalilianum J.V. Gadpayale, S.R. Somkuwar & A.A. Chaturvedi	2017	India
	Amorphophallus sinuatus Hett. & V.D.Nguyen	2003	Vietnam
	Amorphophallus sizemoreae Hett.	2001	Thailand
	Amorphophallus sylvaticus (Roxb.) Kunth	1841	India, Sri Lanka
	Amorphophallus symonianus Hett. & Sizemore	2001	Thailand
	Amorphophallus synandrifer Hett. & V.D.Nguyen	2001	Vietnam
	Amorphophallus thaiensis (S.Y.Hu) Hett.	2012	northern Thailand
	Amorphophallus tonkinensis Engl. & Gehrm.	1911	Yunnan, northern Vietnam
	Amorphophallus tuberculatus Hett. & V.D.Nguyen	2006	Vietnam
	Amorphophallus vogelianus Hett. & Billensteiner	2003	Thailand
	Amorphophallus xiei H.Li & Z.L.Dao	2006	China (W. Yunnan)
	Amorphophallus yuloensis H.Li	1998	China (Yunnan), Myanmar
	Amorphophallus yunnanensis Engl. (Kerri's giant arum)	1911	China, Laos, northern Thailand and Vietnam

=== Subgenus Afrophallus Hett. & Claudel ===
Image	Name	Year	Distribution
	Amorphophallus abyssinicus (A.Rich.) N.E.Br.	1901	southern Ethiopia
	Amorphophallus andranogidroensis Hett. & Mangelsdorff	2006	Madagascar
	Amorphophallus angolensis (Welw. ex Schott) N.E.Br.	1901	Angola, Cabinda, Gabon, Sudan, Zaïre
	Amorphophallus ankarana Hett., Ittenbach & Bogner	1999	Madagascar
	Amorphophallus antsingyensis Bogner, Hett. & Ittenbach	1999	Madagascar
	Amorphophallus aphyllus (Hook.) Hutch.	1936	Burkina, Central African Repu, Chad, Guinea, Guinea-Bissau, Mali, Senegal, Sierra Leone, Togo
	Amorphophallus barthlottii Ittenb. & Lobin	1997	Ivory Coast, Liberia
	Amorphophallus baumannii (Engl.) N.E.Br.	1901	Benin, Burkina, Central African Repu, Chad, Gambia, Ghana, Guinea-Bissau, Liberia, Niger, Nigeria, Senegal, Sierra Leone, Togo
	Amorphophallus bequaertii De Wild.	1922	Zaïre
	Amorphophallus calabaricus N.E.Br.	1901	Benin, Cameroon, Kenya, Nigeria, Uganda, Zaïre
	Amorphophallus canaliculatus Ittenb., Hett. & Lobin	1997	Gabon
	Amorphophallus consimilis Blume	1837	Gambia, Senegal
	Amorphophallus dracontioides (Engl.) N.E.Br.	1901	Benin, Burkina, Central African Repu, Gambia, Ghana, Ivory Coast, Niger, Nigeria, Togo
	Amorphophallus eichleri (Engl.) Hook.f.	1889	Zaïre
	Amorphophallus elliottii Hook.f.	1894	Sierra Leone
	Amorphophallus erythrorrhachis Hett., O. Pronk & R. Kaufmann	2014	Madagascar
	Amorphophallus gallaensis (Engl.) N.E.Br.	1901	Ethiopia, Kenya, Somalia
	Amorphophallus gomboczianus Pic.Serm.	1950	Ethiopia
	Amorphophallus goetzei (Engl.) N.E.Br.	1901	Mozambique, Tanzania, Zaïre
	Amorphophallus gracilior Hutch.	1939	Benin, Nigeria
	Amorphophallus hetterscheidii Ittenb. & Lobin	1997	Central African Republic, Gabon, Zaïre
	Amorphophallus hildebrandtii (Engl.) Engl. & Gehrm.	1911	Madagascar
	Amorphophallus impressus Ittenb.	1997	Malawi, Tanzania
	Amorphophallus johnsonii N.E.Br.	1901	Benin, Burkina, Ghana, Guinea, Ivory Coast, Liberia, Mali
	Amorphophallus lewallei Malaisse & Bamps	1993	Burundi
	Amorphophallus mangelsdorffii Bogner	2003	Madagascar.
	Amorphophallus margretae Ittenb.	1997	Zaïre
	Amorphophallus maximus (Engl.) N.E.Br.	1901	Kenya, Mozambique, Somalia, Tanzania, Zimbabwe
	Amorphophallus mildbraedii K.Krause	1924	Cameroon
	Amorphophallus mossambicensis (Schott ex Garcke) N.E.Br.	1901	Mozambique, Tanzania, Zambia, Zaïre, Zimbabwe
	Amorphophallus mullendersii Malaisse & Bamps	1993	Angola, Zaïre
	Amorphophallus perrieri Hett. & Wahlert	2014	Madagascar
	Amorphophallus preussii (Engl.) N.E.Br.	1901	Cameroon
	Amorphophallus richardsiae Ittenb.	1997	Zambia
	Amorphophallus staudtii(Engl.) N.E.Br.	1901	Cameroon, Congo
	Amorphophallus stuhlmannii (Engl.) Engl. & Gehrm.	1911	Kenya, Tanzania, Zaïre
	Amorphophallus taurostigma Ittenb., Hett. & Bogner	1999	Madagascar
	Amorphophallus teuszii (Engl.) Mottet	1892	Angola, Zaïre
	Amorphophallus zenkeri (Engl.) N.E.Br.	1901	Cameroon, Gulf of Guinea Is., Nigeria

=== Subgenus unplaced ===
- Amorphophallus gliruroides Engl. – Myanmar
- Amorphophallus incurvatus Alderw. – Sumatra
- Amorphophallus lyratus (Roxb.) Kunth – SE India
- Amorphophallus mekongensis Engl. & Gehrm. – Laos, Vietnam
- Amorphophallus paucisectus Alderw. – Sumatra
- Amorphophallus perakensis Engl. – Peninsula Malaysia

== Bibliography ==
- Hetterscheid, W.L.A. 1994. Preliminary taxonomy and morphology of Amorphophallus Blume ex Decaisne (Araceae). In: M.M. Serebreyanyi (ed.), Proc. Moscow Aroid Conference 1992: 35-48. Moscow.
- Hetterscheid, W.L.A. & G.J.C.M. v. Vliet, 1996. Amorphophallus, giant from the forest. CITES/C&M, 2(4): 86-96.
- Kite, Geoffrey C.; et al. (2000). "Inflorescence odours and pollinators of Arum and Amorphophallus (Araceae)" (PDF). Reproductive Biology in Systematics, Conservation and Economic Botany. pp. 295–315. ISBN 1900347628.
