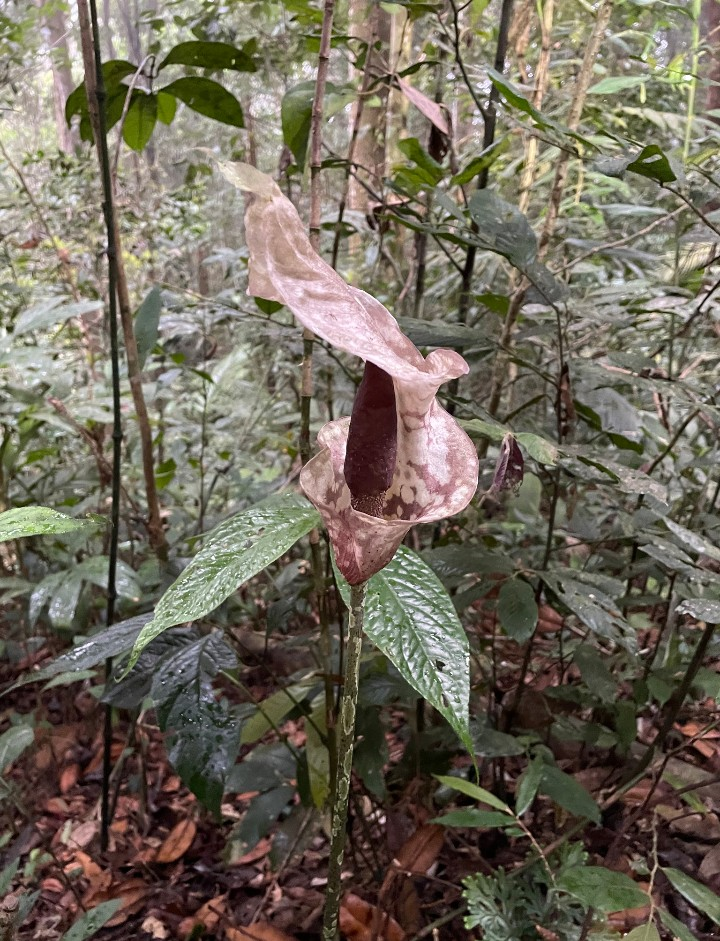

Scientific classification
- Kingdom: Plantae
- Clade: Tracheophytes
- Clade: Angiosperms
- Clade: Monocots
- Order: Alismatales
- Family: Araceae
- Genus: Amorphophallus
- Species: A. bufo

Binomial name
- Amorphophallus bufo Ridl. (1909)

= Amorphophallus bufo =

Species of plant

Amorphophallus bufo is a species of flowering plant in the arum family Araceae, native to Peninsular Malaysia and Sumatra. Its petioles have numerous black spots; it is thought this is defensive mimicry, with the spots appearing to herbivores to be a swarm of ants guarding the plant.
