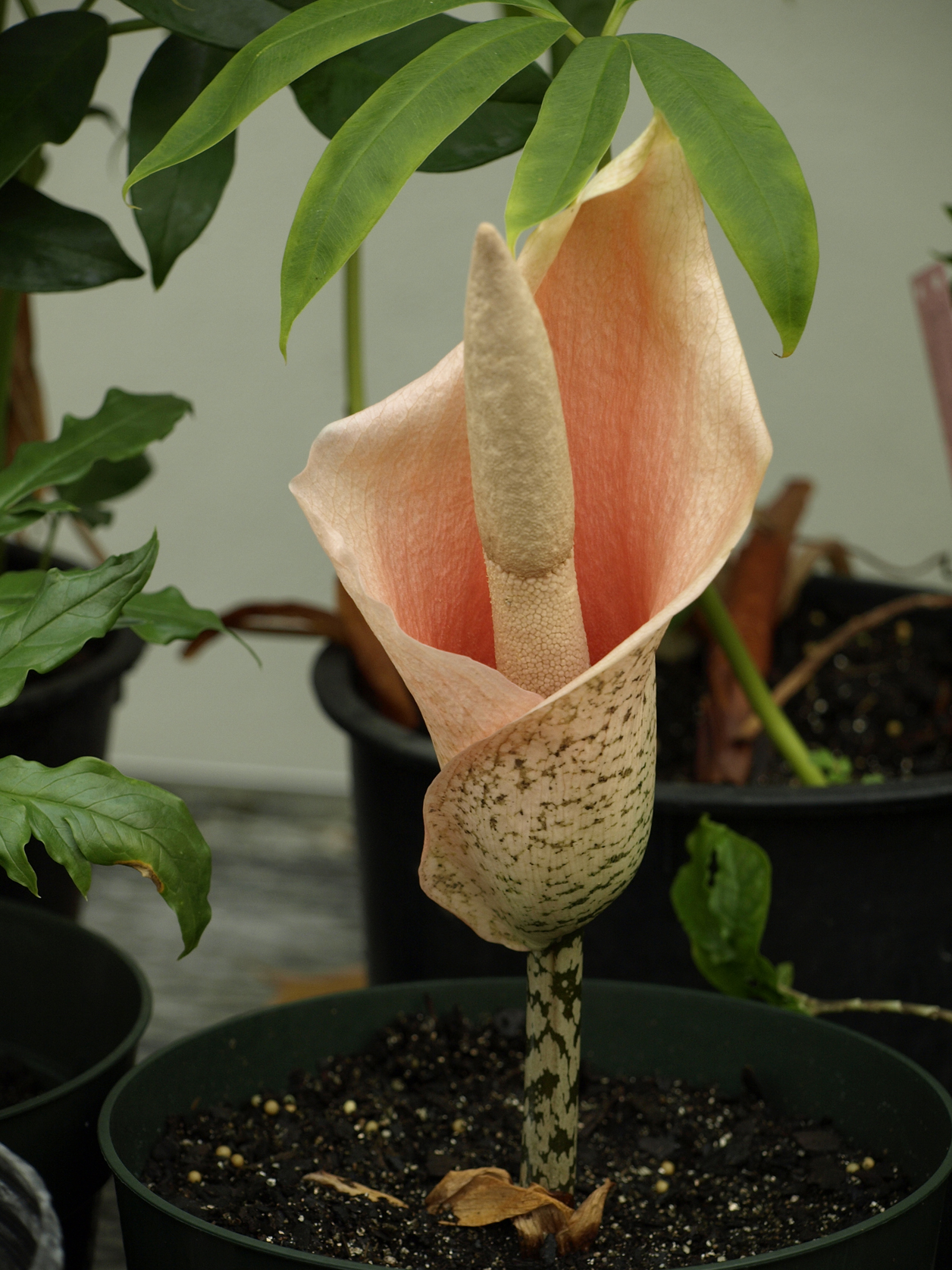

Scientific classification
- Kingdom: Plantae
- Clade: Tracheophytes
- Clade: Angiosperms
- Clade: Monocots
- Order: Alismatales
- Family: Araceae
- Genus: Amorphophallus
- Species: A. bulbifer

Binomial name
- Amorphophallus bulbifer (Roxb.) Blume, 1837

Synonyms
- Arum punctulatum Zipp. ex Kunth,1841; Arum spectabile Zipp. ex Kunth, 1841; Conophallus tuberculiger Schott, 1859).; Amorphophallus tuberculiger (Schott) Engl. in A.L.P.de Candolle & A.C.P.de Candolle, 1879; Amorphophallus aculatum Hook.f., 1893.; Amorphophallus taccoides Hook.f., 1893; Amorphophallus bulbifer var. atroviridimaculata Engl., 1911.; Amorphophallus bulbifer var. marmoratus Engl., Das Pflanzenreich, 1911.; Amorphophallus bulbifer var. tuberculiger (Schott) Engl., 1911.

= Amorphophallus bulbifer =

Species of flowering plant

Amorphophallus bulbifer is a species of subtropical tuberous herbaceous plant found in Assam; Bangladesh; China South-Central; East Himalaya; India; Myanmar; Nepal.
