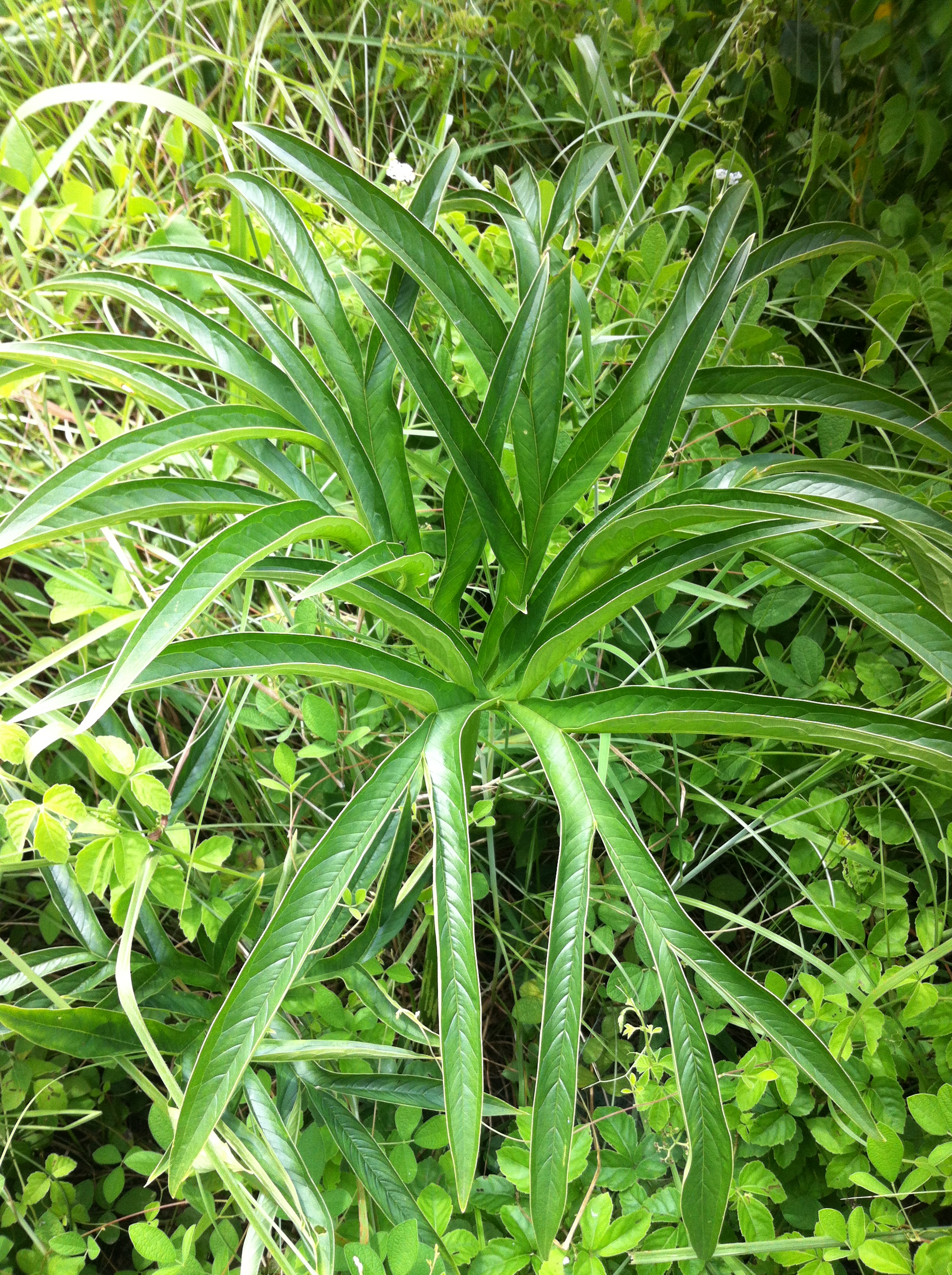
- Young plant in Bangladesh

Scientific classification
- Kingdom: Plantae
- Clade: Tracheophytes
- Clade: Angiosperms
- Clade: Monocots
- Order: Alismatales
- Family: Araceae
- Genus: Amorphophallus
- Species: A. margaritifer

Binomial name
- Amorphophallus margaritifer (Roxb.) Kunth

Synonyms
- Arum margaritiferum Roxb.; Plesmonium dubium Schott; Plesmonium margaritiferum (Roxb.) Schott

= Amorphophallus margaritifer =

Species of flowering plant

Amorphophallus margaritifer is a species of plant in the arum family Araceae, native from India to Myanmar.

== Description ==
Amorphophallus margaritifer is an annual herbaceous plant.

== Distribution and habitat ==
Amorphophallus margaritifer is native to India, the region of Assam, Bangladesh, East Himalaya and Myanmar. In Bangladesh, it is recorded growing in moist shady places, often next to agricultural land.

== Uses ==
The peduncles are used as a vegetable.
