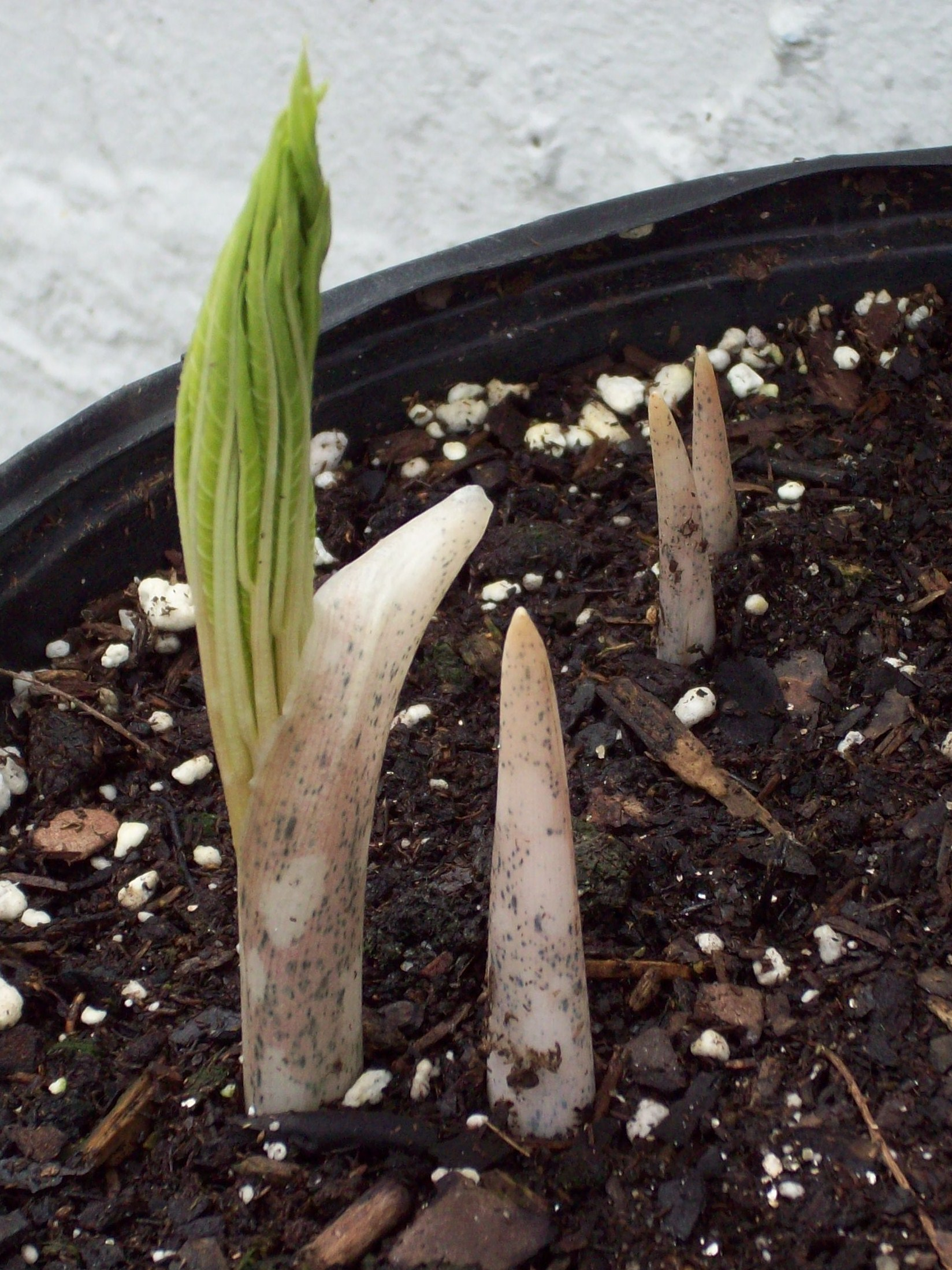

Scientific classification
- Kingdom: Plantae
- Clade: Tracheophytes
- Clade: Angiosperms
- Clade: Monocots
- Order: Alismatales
- Family: Araceae
- Genus: Amorphophallus
- Species: A. abyssinicus

Binomial name
- Amorphophallus abyssinicus (A.Rich.) N.E.Br. in D.Oliver & auct. suc. (eds.), 1901

= Amorphophallus abyssinicus =

Species of flowering plant

Amorphophallus abyssinicus, also known as Bagana (Sidamo), is a plant of the genus Amorphophallus. It is native to southern Ethiopia, where it is grown in gardens, hence its specific epithet, abyssinicus, derived from Latin and meaning "Abyssinian" or "Ethiopian".

It is cultivated in Gojjam, and the Semien Omo Zone and Konso special woreda of the Southern Nations, Nationalities and Peoples Region, on lands between 1300 and 2000 meters above sea level. The tuberous roots are harvested and cooked for a long time before eating.

== Subspecies ==
- Amorphophallus abyssinicus subsp. abyssinicus.
- Amorphophallus abyssinicus subsp. akeassii Ittenbach, 1997
- Amorphophallus abyssinicus subsp. unyikae (Engl. & Gehrm.) Ittenb. ex Govaerts & Frodin, 2002
