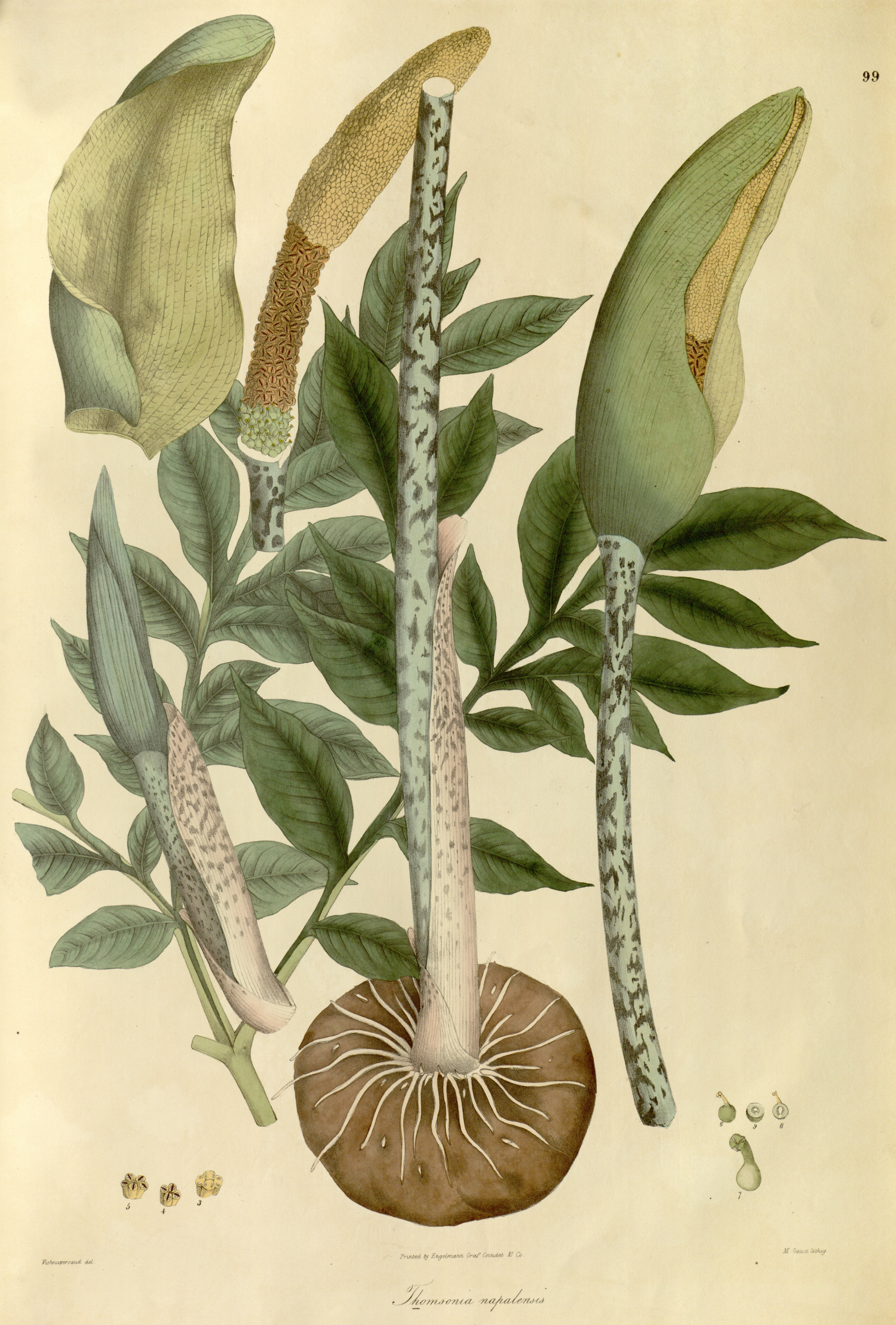

Scientific classification
- Kingdom: Plantae
- Clade: Tracheophytes
- Clade: Angiosperms
- Clade: Monocots
- Order: Alismatales
- Family: Araceae
- Genus: Amorphophallus
- Species: A. napalensis

Binomial name
- Amorphophallus napalensis (Wall.) Bogner & Mayo

= Amorphophallus napalensis =

Species of plant

Amorphophallus napalensis is a species in the family Araceae known from the Himalayan regions of Bhutan, Nepal and India. They belong to the Candarum section in which the spathe is convoluted below, oblong to oblong-ovate or ovate-lanceolate and the spadix shorter than the spathe with styles 2-4 times the length of the ovary. The spathe opens at dusk and is visited by a number of species of beetle which are attracted by the odour of methyl mercaptan. Beetles of the genus Parastasia were the commonest visitors in Nagaland.
