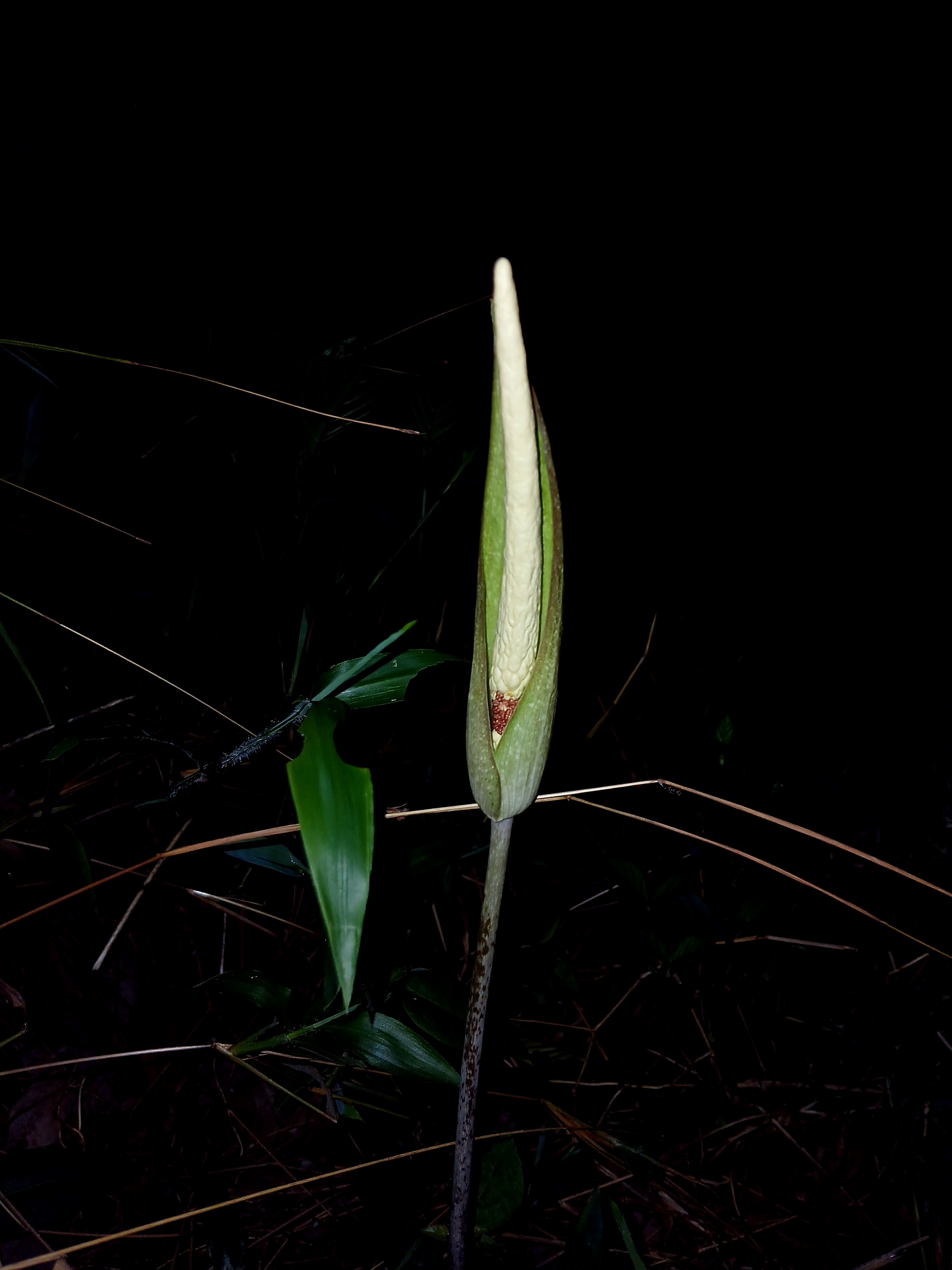

Scientific classification
- Kingdom: Plantae
- Clade: Tracheophytes
- Clade: Angiosperms
- Clade: Monocots
- Order: Alismatales
- Family: Araceae
- Genus: Amorphophallus
- Species: A. hohenackeri

Binomial name
- Amorphophallus hohenackeri (Schott) Engl. & Gehrm.

Synonyms
- Corynophallus hohenackeri (Schott) Kuntze; Hydrosme hohenackeri (Schott) Engl.; Rhaphiophallus hohenackeri Schott

= Amorphophallus hohenackeri =

Species of flowering plant

Amorphophallus hohenackeri is a plant species in the family Araceae.

== Description ==
The plant produces depressed sub-globose tubers with pale brown skin and slender offsets. The petiole is long, smooth, and pale yellowish-green with dark green mottling and cream speckles, subtended by a few pinkish cataphylls. The lamina is 30–45 cm across, with sessile elliptic leaflets that are dark green above, paler beneath, and slightly undulate along the margin. The inflorescence consists of a peduncle resembling the petiole in colour and pattern, a spathe that is light pinkish-yellow with purplish mottling outside and yellowish-green within, and a spadix nearly equal in length to the spathe. Female flowers have small green ovaries with 2–3 locules, while male flowers are yellow. The spadix appendix is cream-coloured, tapering towards the apex, and smooth above. The fruits are oblong, scarlet-red when ripe, and contain 2–3 ovoid seeds. Flowering occurs from March to May, with fruiting from May to August.

== Distribution ==
It is endemic to South West India.
