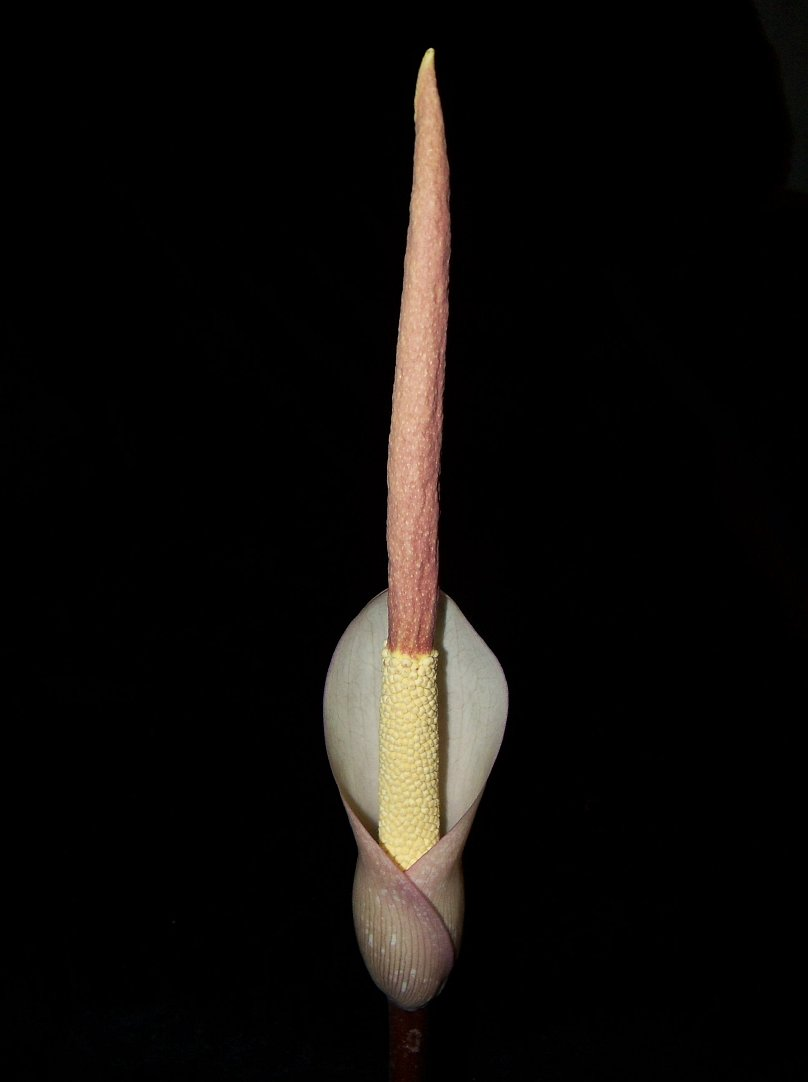

Scientific classification
- Kingdom: Plantae
- Clade: Tracheophytes
- Clade: Angiosperms
- Clade: Monocots
- Order: Alismatales
- Family: Araceae
- Genus: Amorphophallus
- Species: A. atroviridis

Binomial name
- Amorphophallus atroviridis Hett.

= Amorphophallus atroviridis =

Species of plant

Amorphophallus atroviridis is a plant in the family Araceae believed to be endemic to central Thailand, though collection data from Kew Botanical Gardens does not specify locality or distribution. Its name is derived from Latin, with "atro-" translating to "dark", and "viridis" meaning "green", which is likely in reference to the plant's foliage. A. atroviridis has markedly dark emerald-blackish green foliage compared to other species in the genus and has a striking pink margin about the leaf, making it an attractive ornamental plant. The species can be cultivated under temperate conditions or indoors, so long as temperatures are maintained between 5 - 35 °C (40 - 95 °F) and the plant receives sufficient light and is in well-draining soil.
