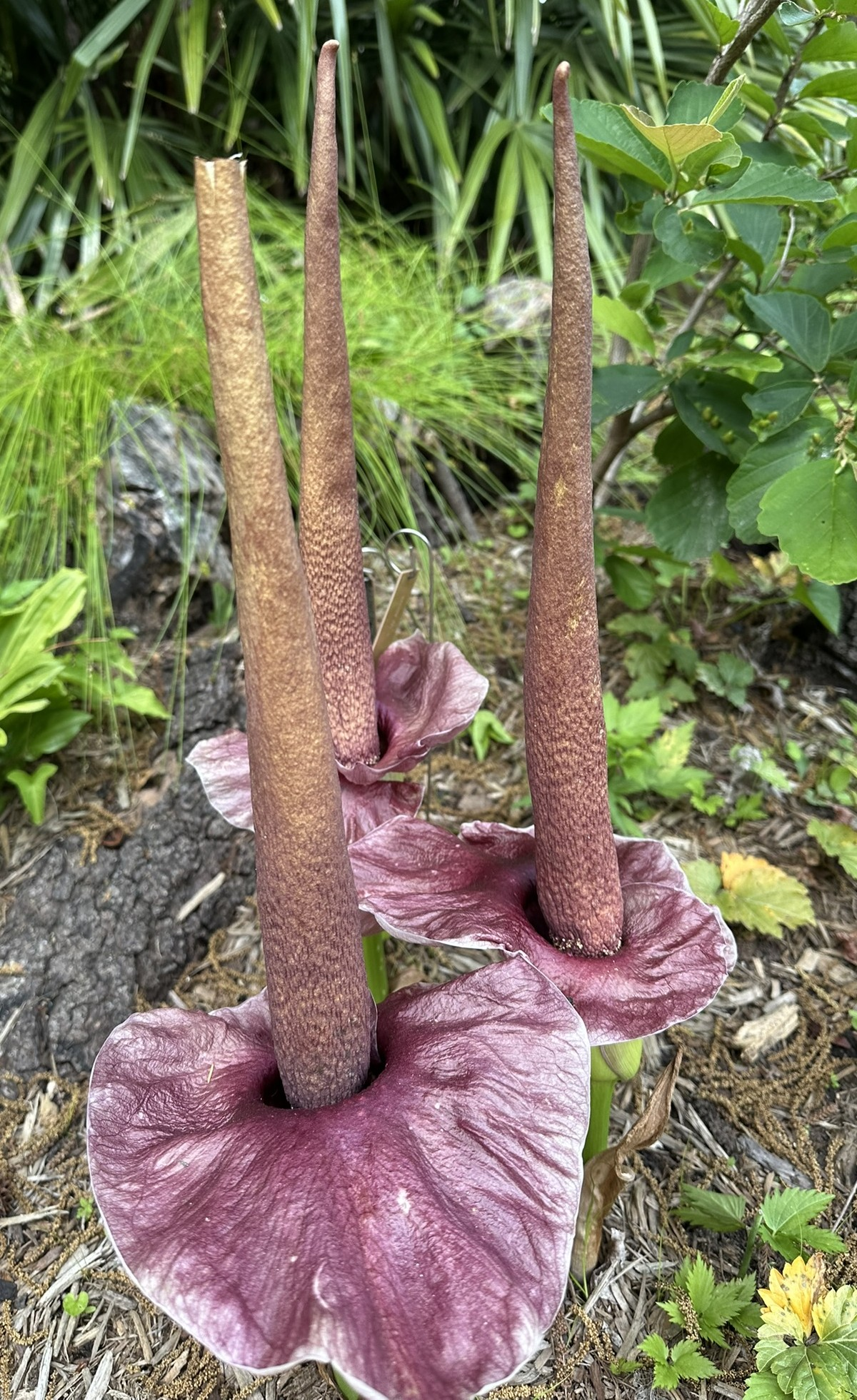
- "Long peduncled" form of A. henryi, Juniper Level Botanic Garden

Scientific classification
- Kingdom: Plantae
- Clade: Tracheophytes
- Clade: Angiosperms
- Clade: Monocots
- Order: Alismatales
- Family: Araceae
- Genus: Amorphophallus
- Species: A. henryi

Binomial name
- Amorphophallus henryi N.E.Br.

Synonyms
- Amorphophallus niimurai Yamam.; Hydrosme niimurai (Yamam.) S.S.Ying

= Amorphophallus henryi =

Species of plant

Amorphophallus henryi is a species of corpse flower endemic to Taiwan.

== Description ==
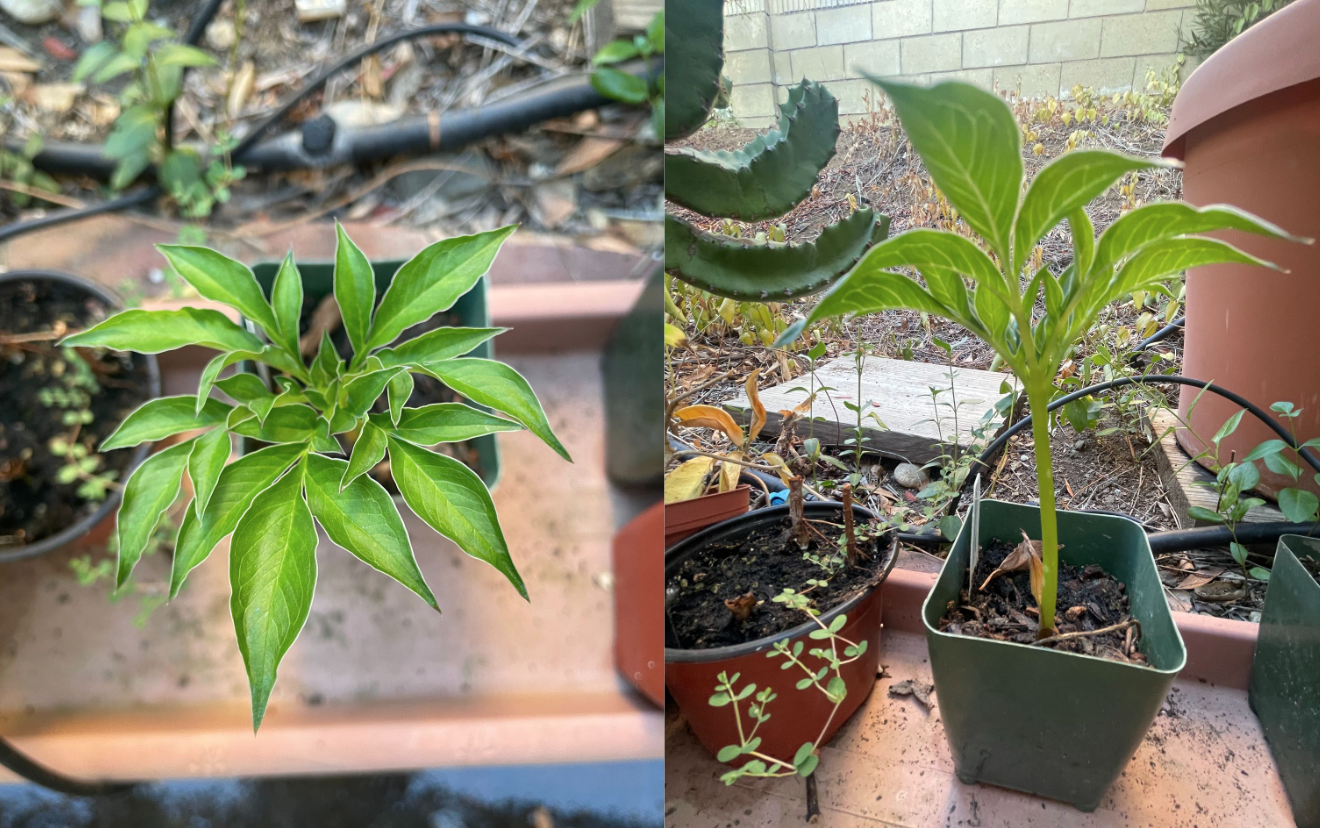
Young plants

Amorphophallus henryi can either flower or leaf out in a year. All leaves are one single leaf, and each bulb can only grow one leaf. Its leaves resemble the leaves of most other species in the genus Amorphophallus, with a large stem and multiple branches of the leaf. Amorphophallus henyri has flowers that are known to be rancid smelling. It has a yellow inflorescence, and is about 1 foot tall.

== Flowers ==
Flowers are simlair to most Amorphophallus, they are stinky to attract their main pollenator flies. Big brown/purplish/red spadix about 1 foot long. Blood red bract that is larger on 1 side and almost nonexsistant on the other.
