= Amorphophallus minimus =

Scientific classification
- Kingdom: Plantae
- Clade: Tracheophytes
- Clade: Angiosperms
- Clade: Monocots
- Order: Alismatales
- Family: Araceae
- Genus: Amorphophallus
- Species: A. minimus

Binomial name
- Amorphophallus minimus R. Bustam., C. Claudel & M.N. Tamayo

Species of plant

Amorphophallus minimus is a species of corpse flower found in the Philippines endemic to the Pantabangan-Carranglan Watershed Forest Reserve, Nueva Ecija province. Amorphophallus minimus is 24 cm in height (making it the smallest species in the genus Amorphophallus in the Philippines) and is the 17th known species in the genus Amorphophallus in the Philippines and is the 198th species of the genus Amorphophallus worldwide. The species has a rust colouration with a lichen like pattern. Amorphophallus minimus grows at an elevation of 950 to 1,400 meters (3,120 to 4,590 ft) and has a small habitat range.

As a result of predation, Amorphophallus minimus utilizes mimicry of its surroundings to avoid being eaten by predators that roam their environment

The Philippine Taxonomic Initiative (PTI) has recognized Amorphophallus minimus as a new species in 2021.
