= Amorphophallus yaoi =

Scientific classification
- Kingdom: Plantae
- Clade: Embryophytes
- Clade: Tracheophytes
- Clade: Spermatophytes
- Clade: Angiosperms
- Clade: Monocots
- Order: Alismatales
- Family: Araceae
- Genus: Amorphophallus
- Species: A. yaoi

Binomial name
- Amorphophallus yaoi Hett., A.Galloway & Medecilo

Species of flowering plant

Amorphophallus yaoi is a small to medium sized species of the genus Amorphophallus, endemic to Panay and the Romblon Islands of the Philippines. It belongs to the arum family (Araceae). The spadix is thin and tall to about 40 centimetres (16 in), while the spathe is oval-shaped, around 25–30 centimetres (9.8–11.8 in) long and 22–28 centimetres (8.7–11.0 in) wide. The species name honors botanist George C. Yao.
