= Amorphophallus mekongensis =

Scientific classification
- Kingdom: Plantae
- Clade: Tracheophytes
- Clade: Angiosperms
- Clade: Monocots
- Order: Alismatales
- Family: Araceae
- Genus: Amorphophallus
- Species: A. mekongensis

Binomial name
- Amorphophallus mekongensis Engl. & Gehrm.

Species of flowering plant

Amorphophallus mekongensis is a species of tuberous plant in the family Araceae. It can be found in Vietnam & Laos; in Viet Nam it is called nưa Cửu Long (or ~ Mê Kông). No subspecies are listed in the Catalogue of Life.
