= Amorphophallus hewittii =

Scientific classification
- Kingdom: Plantae
- Clade: Tracheophytes
- Clade: Angiosperms
- Clade: Monocots
- Order: Alismatales
- Family: Araceae
- Genus: Amorphophallus
- Species: A. hewittii

Binomial name
- Amorphophallus hewittii Alderw.

Plant found in East Malaysia

Amorphophallus hewittii is geophytic aroid of family Araceae.

== Description ==
It is found primarily in Sarawak, Malaysian Borneo. It is the nearest relative of Amorphophallus titanum. The spathe is about 1 m (3 ft) in height and green. The spadix is about 1.5 m (5 ft) high and lavender. The stalk or pedicel is longer than that of A. titanum, sometimes up to 3 m (10 ft) tall. The petiole is marked with blotches of pink and various shades of green. This species was described by Van Alderwelt in 1920.
