= Amorphophallus elegans =

Scientific classification
- Kingdom: Plantae
- Clade: Tracheophytes
- Clade: Angiosperms
- Clade: Monocots
- Order: Alismatales
- Family: Araceae
- Genus: Amorphophallus
- Species: A. elegans

Binomial name
- Amorphophallus elegans Ridl., 1922

Species of flowering plant

Amorphophallus elegans is a species of plant from the family Araceae. It is found from South Thailand to Peninsular Malaysia.
