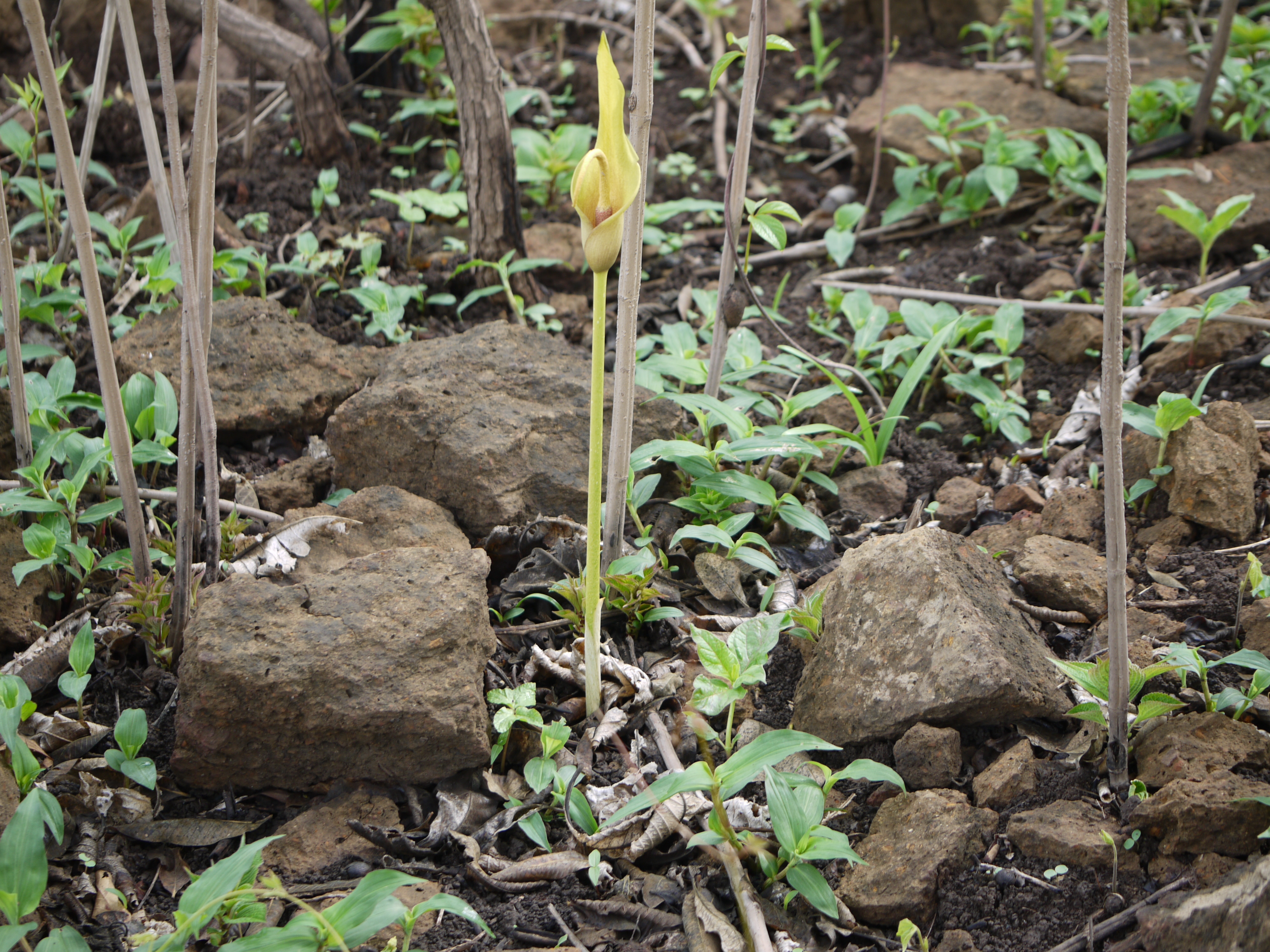

Scientific classification
- Kingdom: Plantae
- Clade: Tracheophytes
- Clade: Angiosperms
- Clade: Monocots
- Order: Alismatales
- Family: Araceae
- Genus: Amorphophallus
- Species: A. commutatus

Binomial name
- Amorphophallus commutatus L.

Synonyms
- Conophallus commutatus Dunal; Amorphophallus commutatus var. wayanadensis Poir.

= Amorphophallus commutatus =

Species of flowering plant

Amorphophallus commutatus, or dragon stalk yam (Marathi- shevale, mogari kanda; Hindi- jungli suran), is a plant species in the family Araceae. Amorphophallus is a large genus of some 170 tropical and subtropical tuberous herbaceous plants, which includes the world's largest flower, titan arum.
