= Amorphophallus pusillus =

Scientific classification
- Kingdom: Plantae
- Clade: Tracheophytes
- Clade: Angiosperms
- Clade: Monocots
- Order: Alismatales
- Family: Araceae
- Genus: Amorphophallus
- Species: A. pusillus

Binomial name
- Amorphophallus pusillus Hett., Serebryanyi (1994)

Species of flowering plant

Amorphophallus pusillus is a perennial herbaceous flowering plant in the family Araceae. It is endemic to Vietnam.

A. pusillus is a tuberous geophyte and grows primarily in the wet tropical areas. It is the smallest member of the genus, with a spathe 2–2.8 long and 2.5–3.2 cm diameter, and a spadix 4.4–5.7 cm long.
