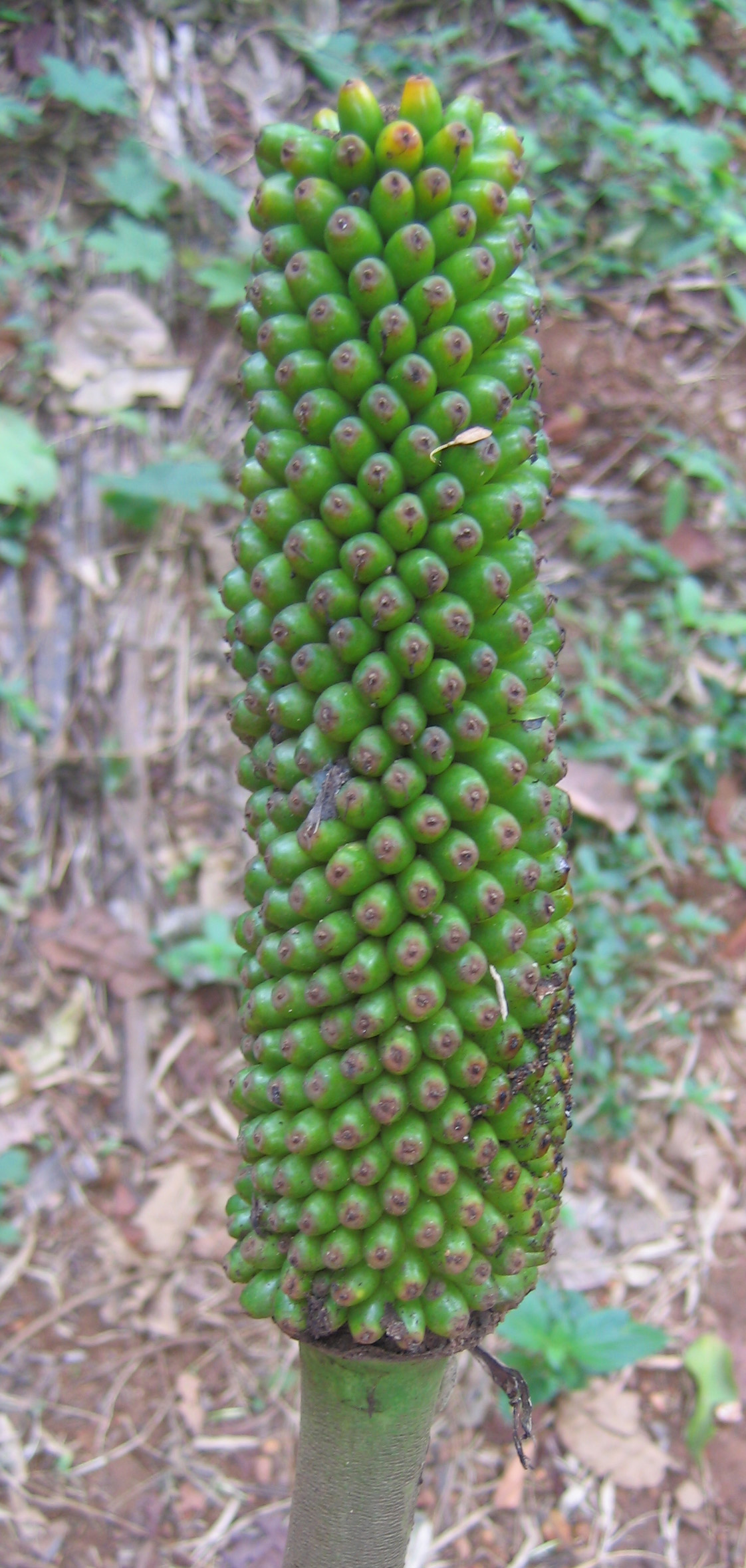

Scientific classification
- Kingdom: Plantae
- Clade: Tracheophytes
- Clade: Angiosperms
- Clade: Monocots
- Order: Alismatales
- Family: Araceae
- Genus: Amorphophallus
- Species: A. sylvaticus

Binomial name
- Amorphophallus sylvaticus (Roxb.) Kunth

= Amorphophallus sylvaticus =

Species of flowering plant

Amorphophallus sylvaticus is a flowering plant species in India. This is used in herbal medicine.

== Gallery ==
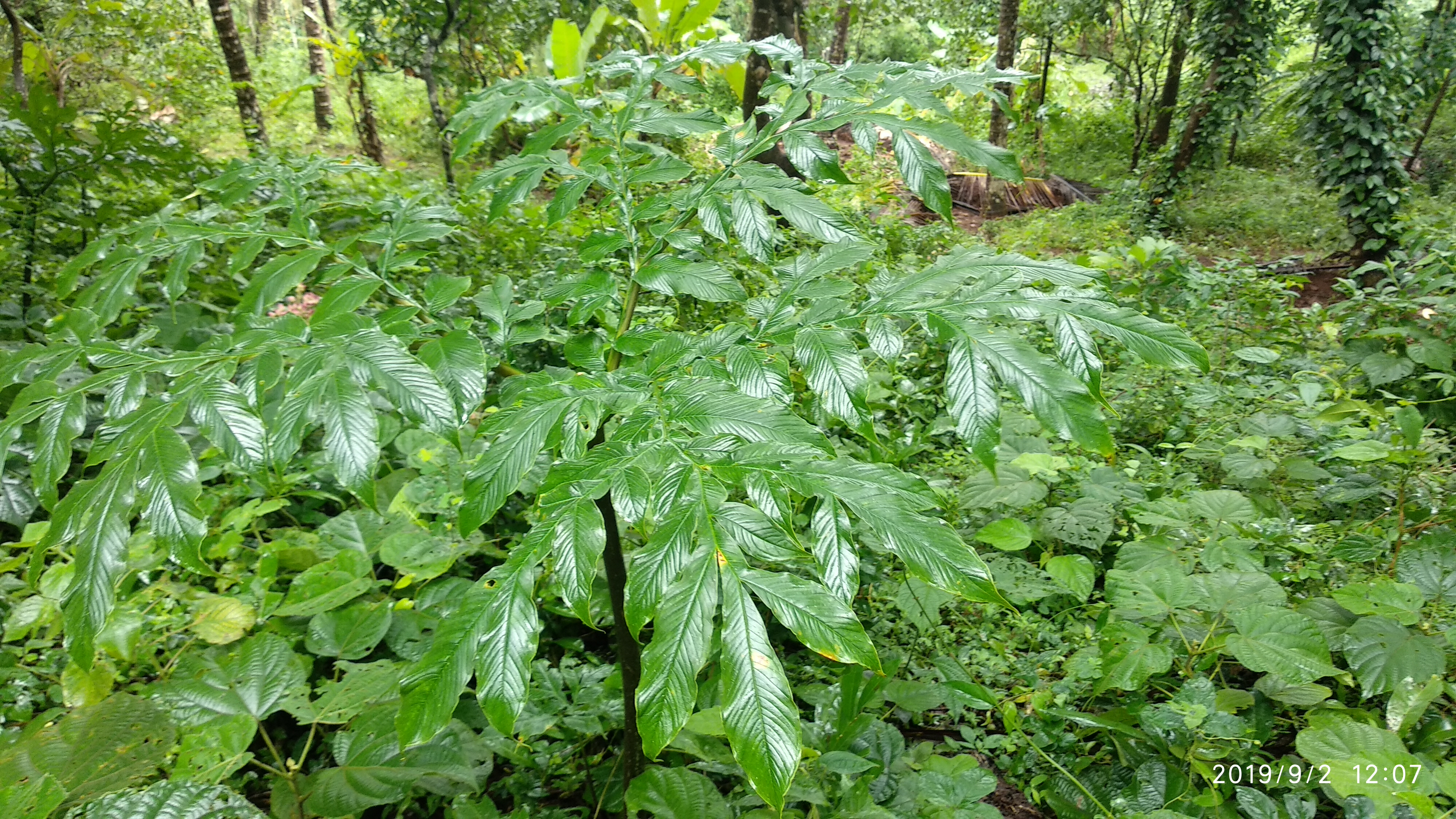
Amorphophallus sylvaticusleaf top view

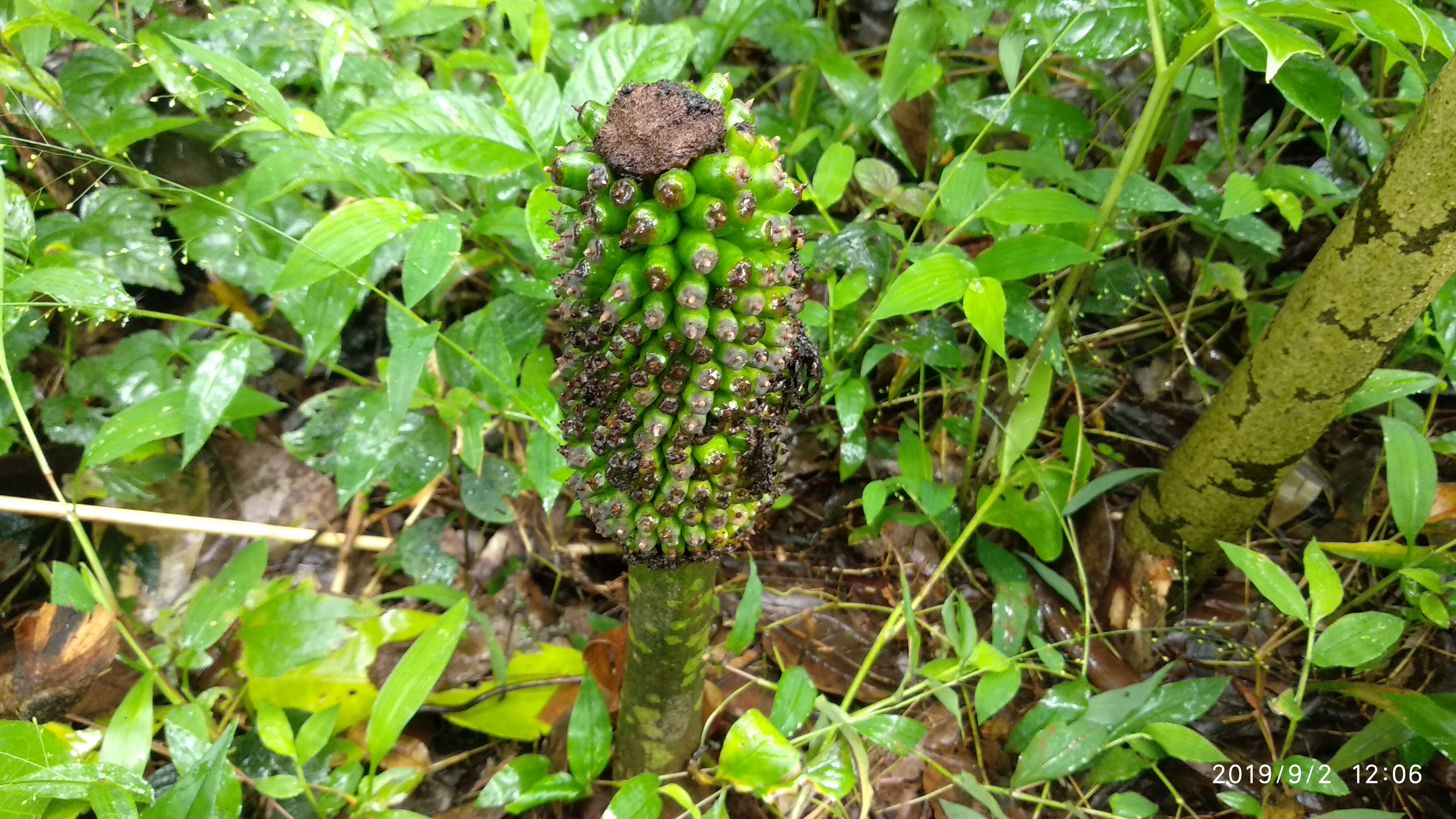
Amorphophallus sylvaticus fruits

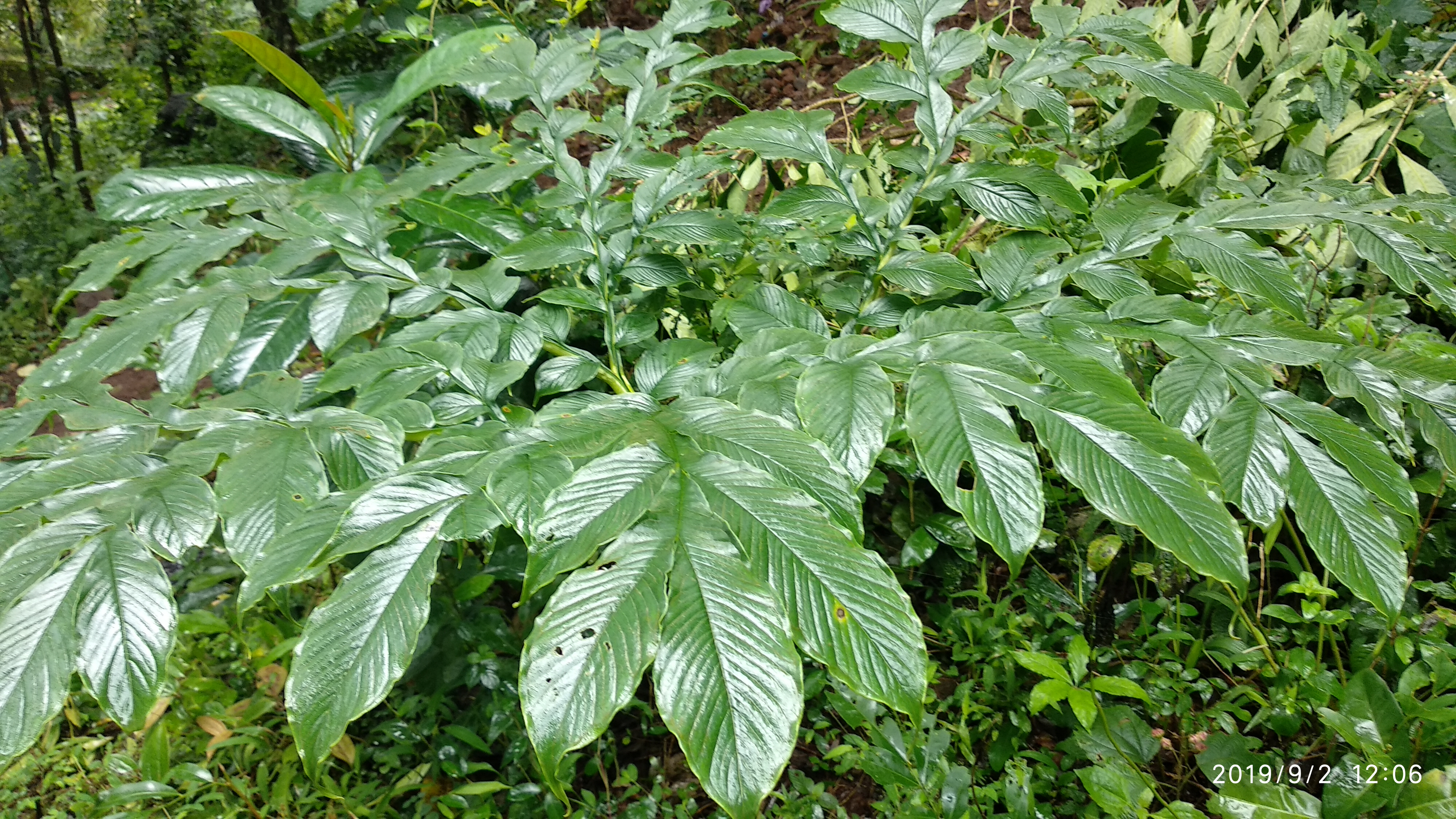
Amorphophallus sylvaticus plant

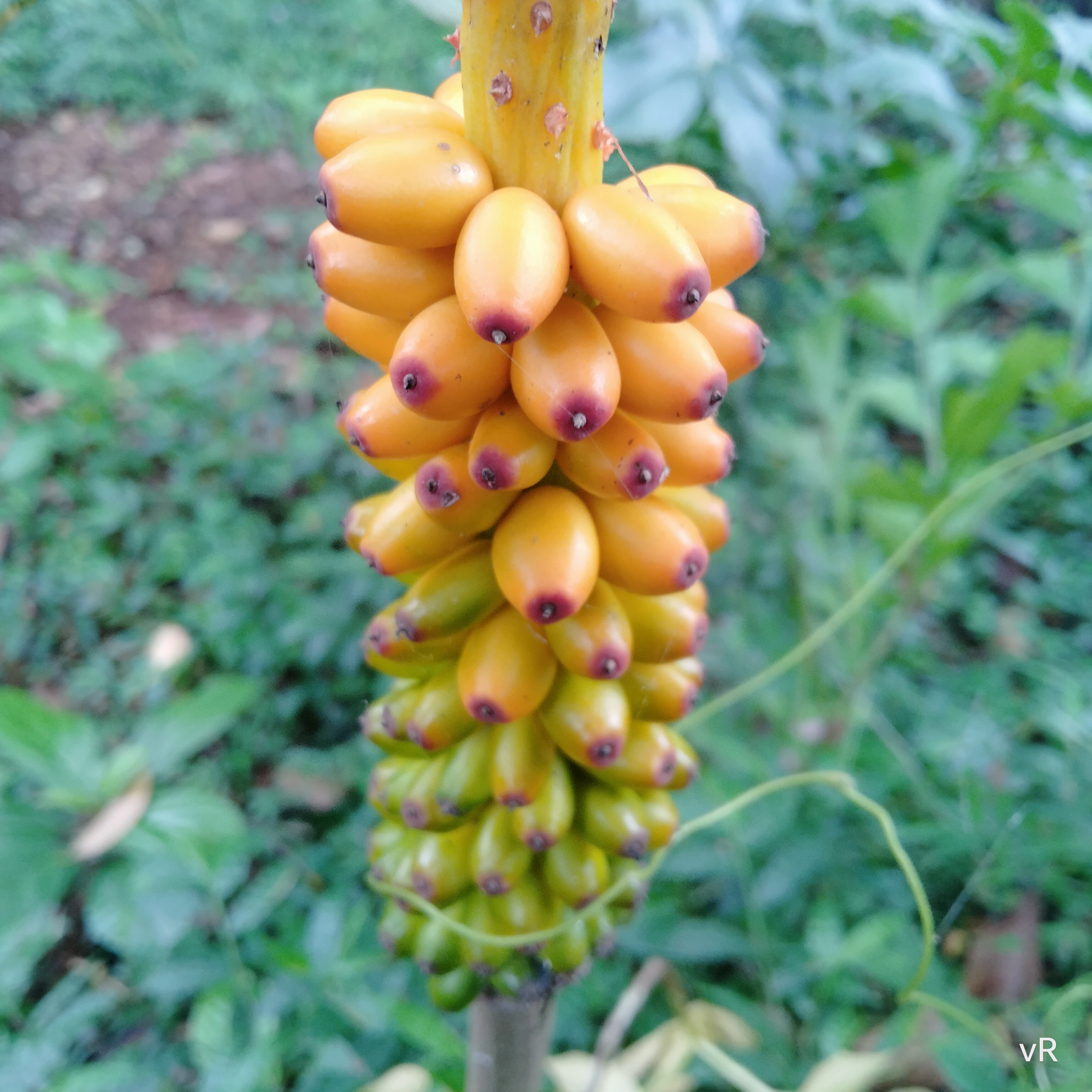
Ripened fruit
