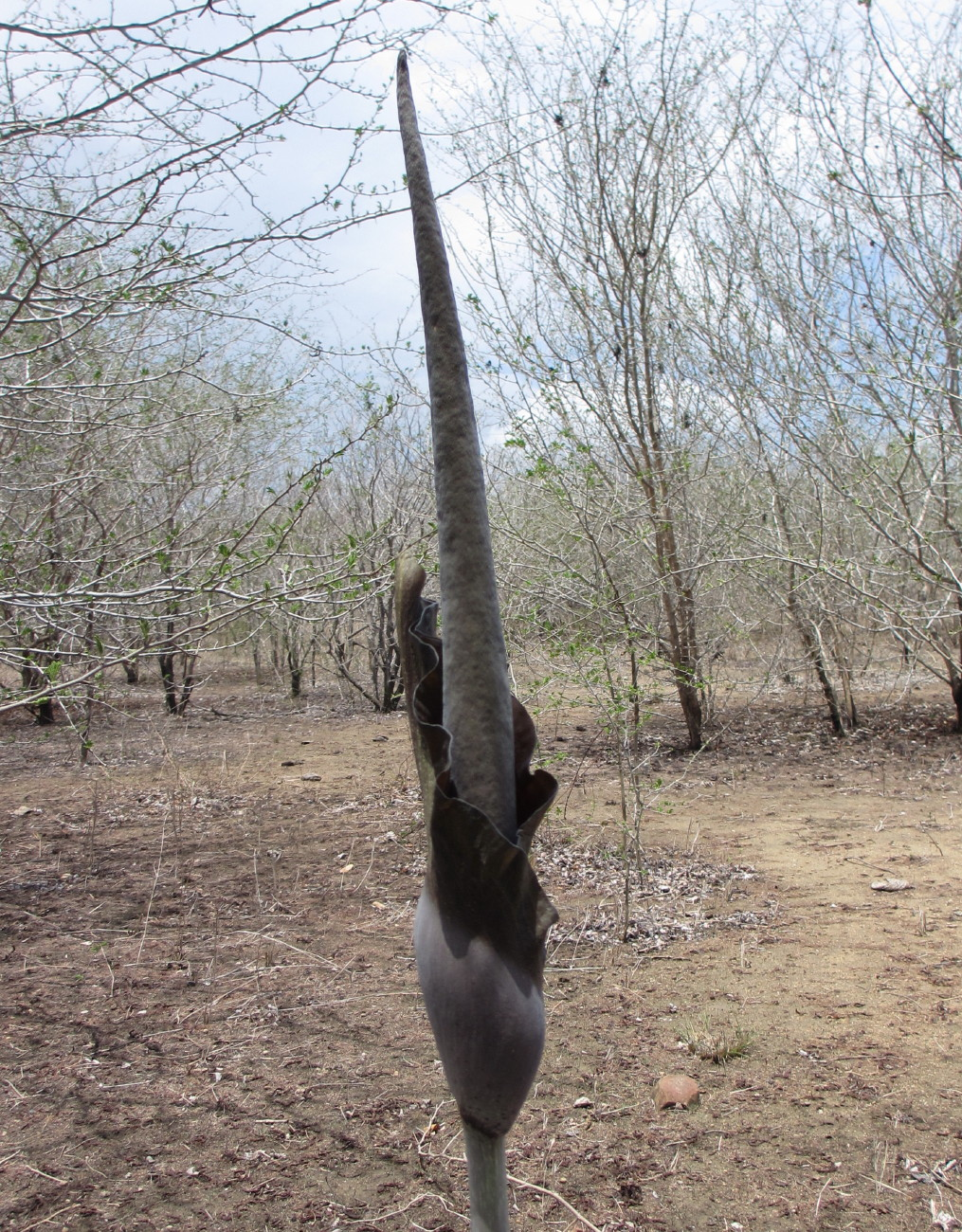

Scientific classification
- Kingdom: Plantae
- Clade: Tracheophytes
- Clade: Angiosperms
- Clade: Monocots
- Order: Alismatales
- Family: Araceae
- Genus: Amorphophallus
- Species: A. maximus

Binomial name
- Amorphophallus maximus (Engl.) N.E.Br. 1901

Synonyms
- Corynophallus maximus (Engl.) Kuntze; Hydrosme maxima Engl.

= Amorphophallus maximus =

Species of flowering plant

Amorphophallus maximus is a species of subtropical tuberous herbaceous plant found in Tanzania and Zimbabwe.
