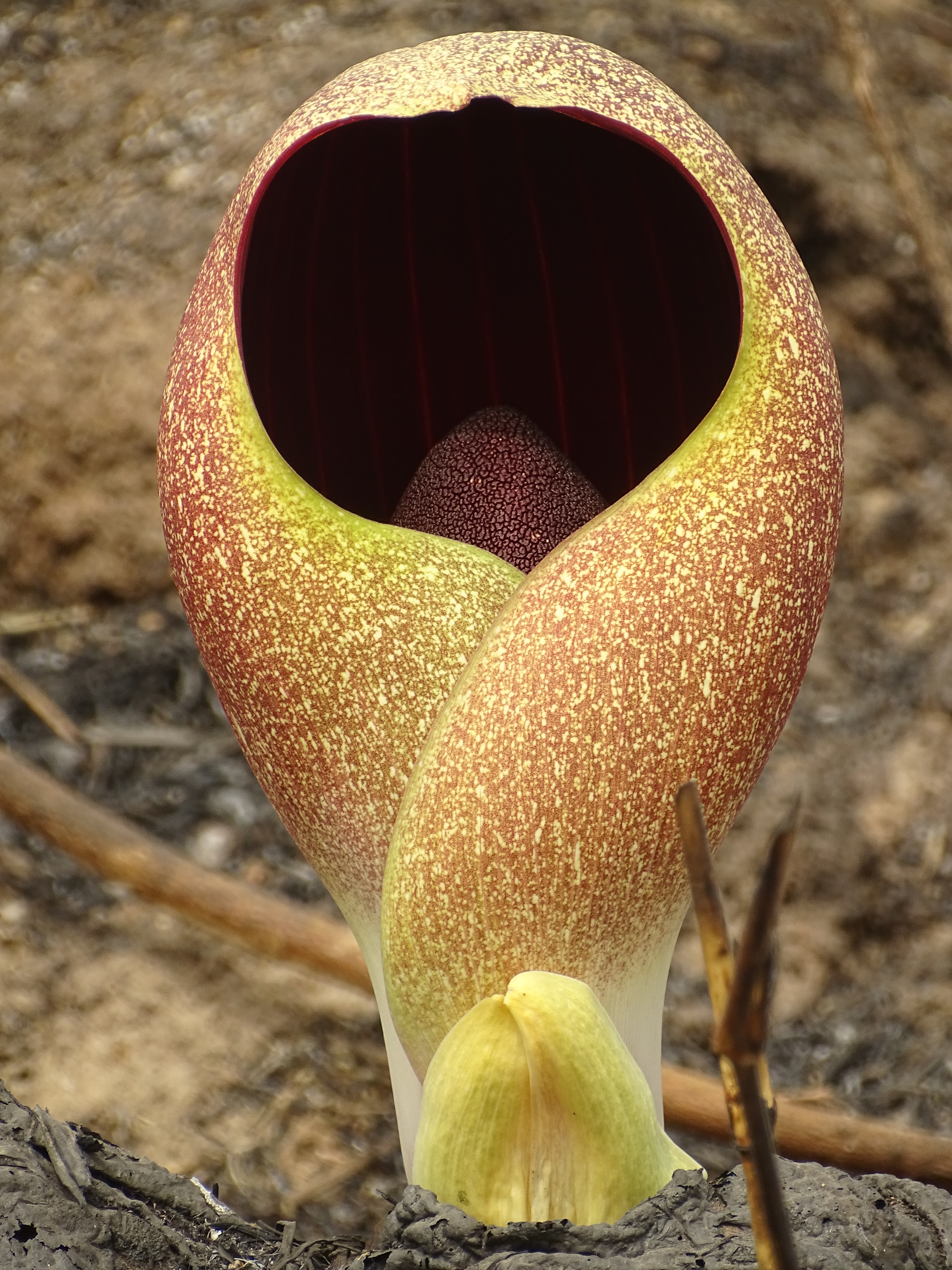

Scientific classification
- Kingdom: Plantae
- Clade: Tracheophytes
- Clade: Angiosperms
- Clade: Monocots
- Order: Alismatales
- Family: Araceae
- Genus: Amorphophallus
- Species: A. dracontioides

Binomial name
- Amorphophallus dracontioides N.E.Br.

= Amorphophallus dracontioides =

Species of plant

Amorphophallus dracontioides or the Dragons Football is a species of plant in the genus Amorphophallus ranging from Ghana to Nigeria.

== Description ==
This species appears as a large, fleshy stemless plant with a magenta/olive overall coloration. It has small olive speckling and a consistently ridged interior.

== Medicinal use ==
This species's root has been used medicinally for hemorrhoids, and breaking down venomous stings/bites.

== Toxins ==
The plant's sap contains saponins and potential steroids and therefore is mildly toxic. Aboriginal people within the range of this plant use these toxins as arrow poison. The root is believed magic.

== Famine food ==
This species has been used within Nigeria as a food of famine. Because this species is toxic it must be boiled for two days to neutralize the toxins.

== Common Names ==
There are countless common names for Amorphophallus dracontioides including:

Dragons Football

The Hyena's Penis Plant
