= Amorphophallus albus =

Scientific classification
- Kingdom: Plantae
- Clade: Tracheophytes
- Clade: Angiosperms
- Clade: Monocots
- Order: Alismatales
- Family: Araceae
- Genus: Amorphophallus
- Species: A. albus

Binomial name
- Amorphophallus albus P.Y.Liu & J.F.Chen

Species of plant

Amorphophallus albus, the white voodoo lily or dwarf white voodoo lily, is a species of flowering plant in the family Araceae. It is native to southern Sichuan and northeastern Yunnan. A tuberous geophyte, it is typically found in dry thickets and open woodlands at elevations from 800 to 1,000 m (2,600 to 3,300 ft). It is grown as a crop in Yunnan, and is occasionally available elsewhere from specialty nurseries.
