= Amorphophallus preussii =

Conservation status
- Vulnerable (IUCN 3.1)

Scientific classification
- Kingdom: Plantae
- Clade: Tracheophytes
- Clade: Angiosperms
- Clade: Monocots
- Order: Alismatales
- Family: Araceae
- Genus: Amorphophallus
- Species: A. preussii

Binomial name
- Amorphophallus preussii (Engl.) N.E.Br.

Synonyms
- Hydrosme preussii Engl.

Species of flowering plant

Amorphophallus preussii is a species of plant in the family Araceae. It is endemic to Cameroon. Its natural habitats are lowland tropical and subtropical moist broadleaf forests and subtropical and montane tropical and subtropical coniferous forests. It is a Vulnerable species threatened by habitat loss.
