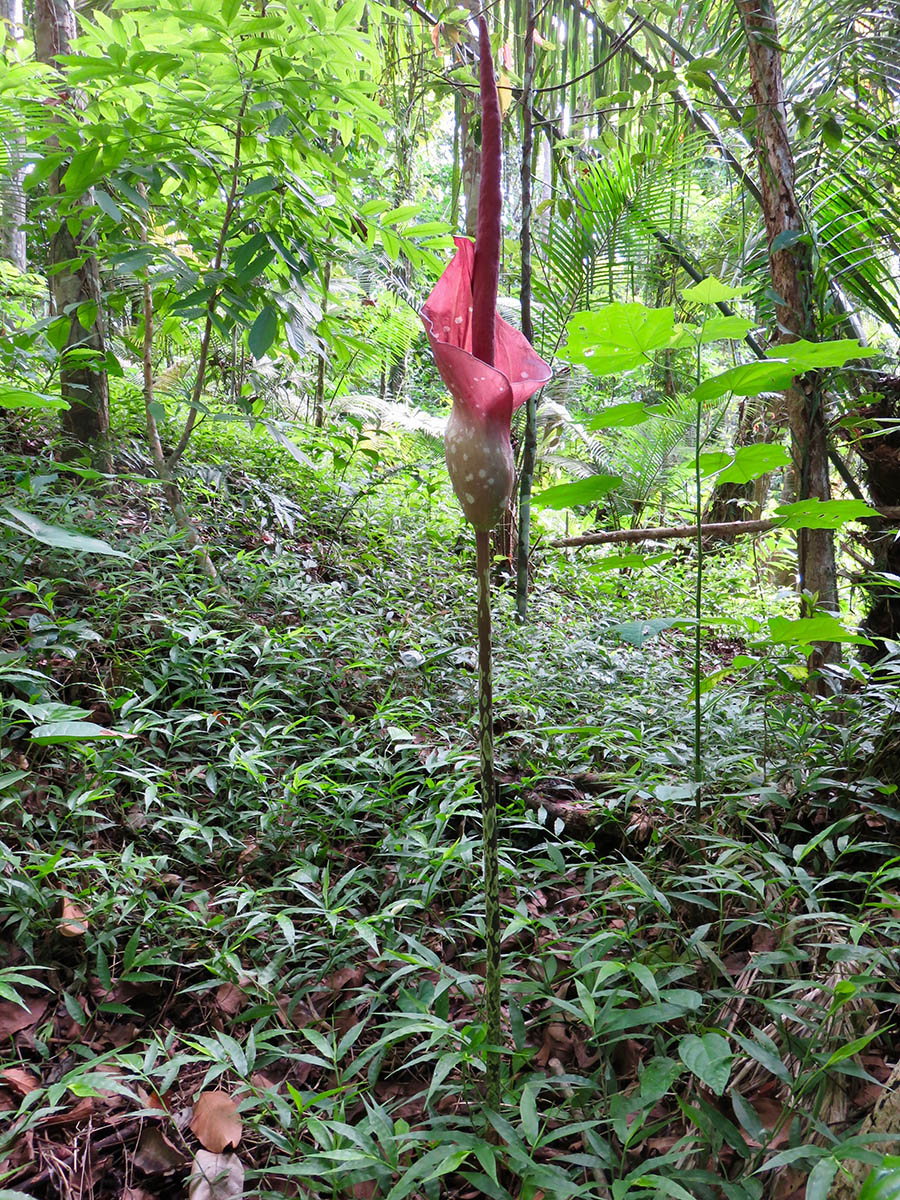

Scientific classification
- Kingdom: Plantae
- Clade: Tracheophytes
- Clade: Angiosperms
- Clade: Monocots
- Order: Alismatales
- Family: Araceae
- Genus: Amorphophallus
- Species: A. longispathaceus

Binomial name
- Amorphophallus longispathaceus Engl. & Gehrm., 1911

Synonyms
- Amorphophallus dactylifer Hett., 1994

= Amorphophallus longispathaceus =

Species of flowering plant

Amorphophallus longispathaceus is a species of corpse flower, of the genus Amorphophallus, native to the southern island of Mindanao in the Philippines and the northern island of Borneo in Indonesia. It produces a tall, single, compound leaf on a thick, fleshy stalk from a big, bowl-shaped tuber. Before a new leaf is produced, mature plants can put up a large, purplish inflorescence that grows to 1 m (3 ft 3 in) in height. The multi-coloured elongated spathe, which is triangular with a bell-shaped base, measuring between 30–38 cm (12–15 in) in length and 12–20 cm (4.7–7.9 in) in width, produces an odour similar to that of rotting flesh in order to attract fly pollinators.

== Gallery ==
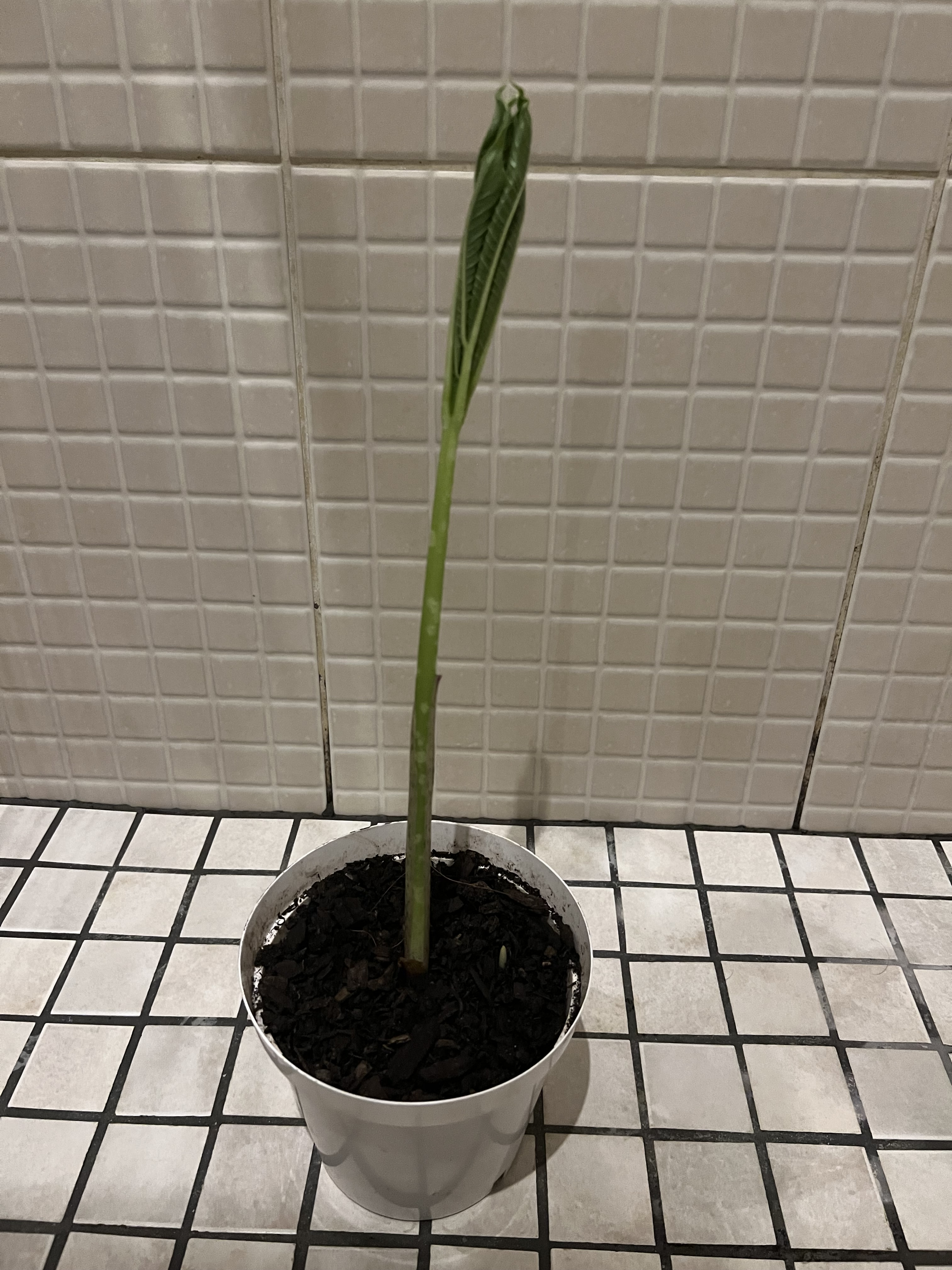
Seedling approximately 3 years old grown from seed

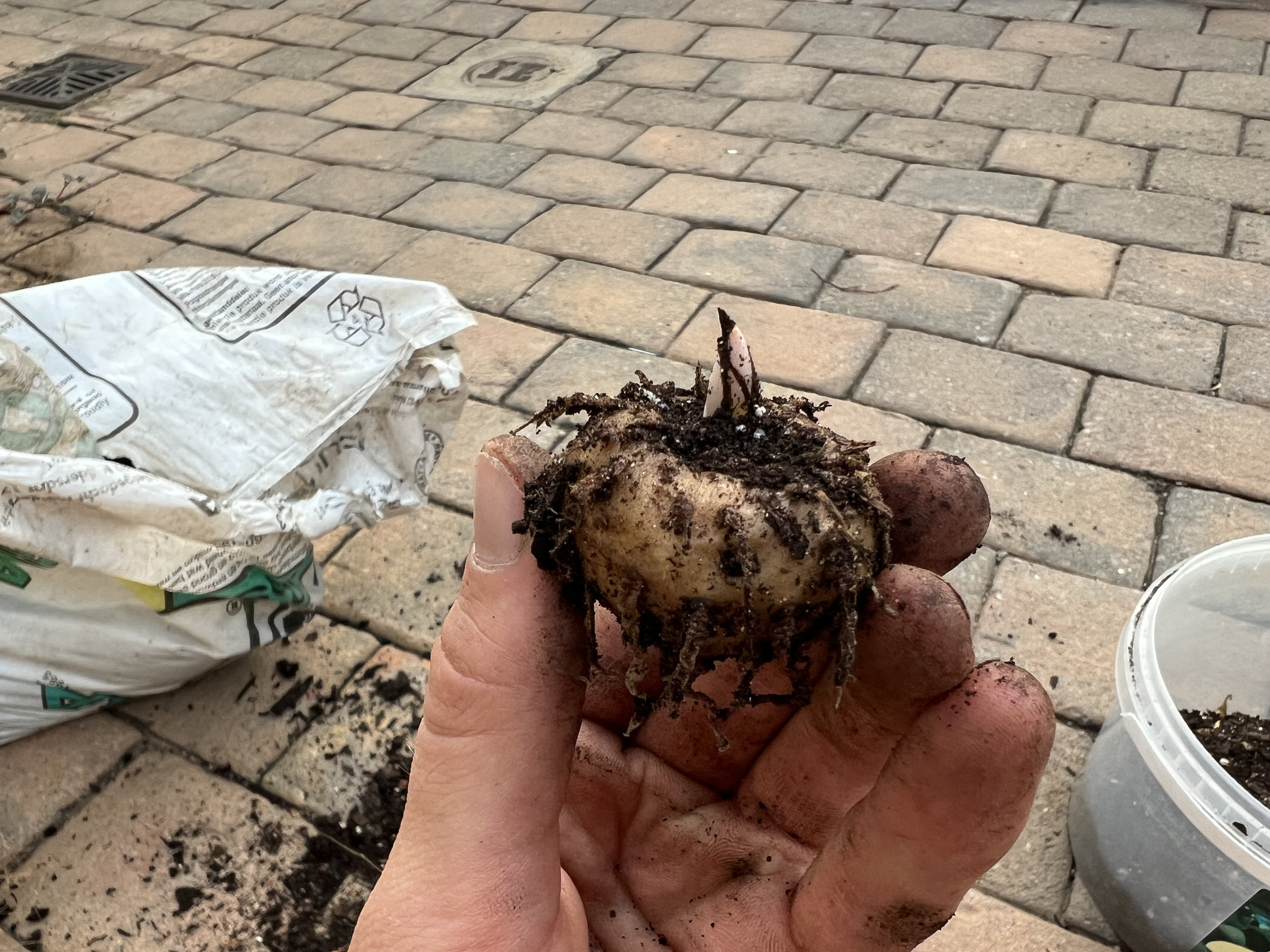
Bulb of seedling approximately 3 years old
