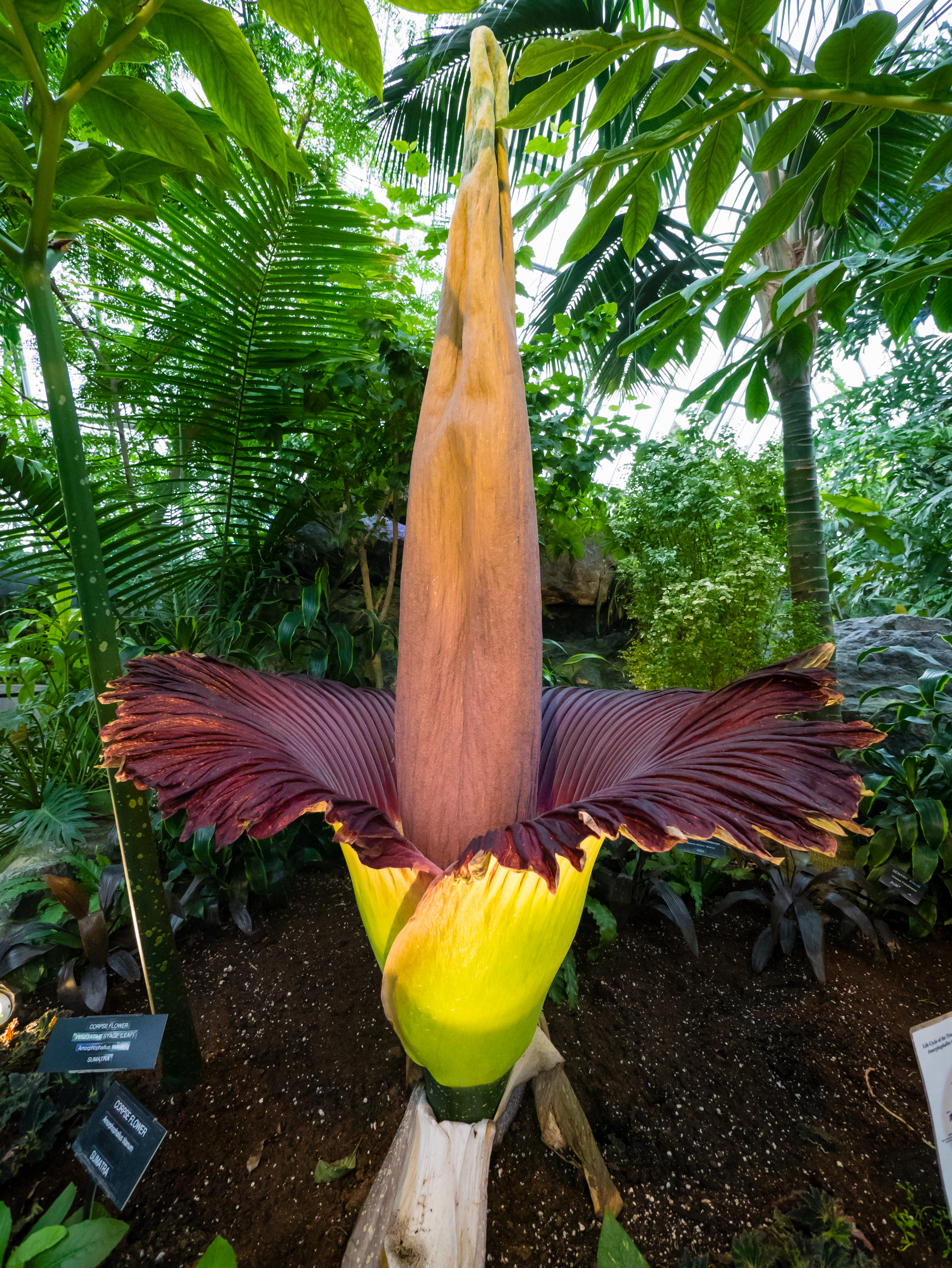
- Amorphophallus titanum, a member of the tribe Thomsonieae

Scientific classification
- Kingdom: Plantae
- Clade: Tracheophytes
- Clade: Angiosperms
- Clade: Monocots
- Order: Alismatales
- Family: Araceae
- Subfamily: Aroideae
- Tribe: Thomsonieae; Blume

Genera
- See text

= Thomsonieae =

Tribe of plants

Thomsonieae is a tribe of plants in the arum family.

== Taxonomy ==
Thomsonieae is now monotypic, having originally contained two genera:

- Amorphophallus Blume ex Decne. synonym: Pseudodracontium N. E. Br.
