= A. gigas =

A. gigas may refer to:

== Plants ==
- Amorphophallus gigas, a species of the genus Amorphophallus

== Animals ==
- Acerentulus gigas
- Aethilla gigas, provisionally accepted name; see Aethilla (butterfly)
- Agdistis gigas, provisionally accepted name for a moth species (Agdistis manicata)
- Agylla gigas, provisionally accepted name
- Alveopora gigas, see IUCN Red List vulnerable species (Animalia)
- Anopheles gigas
- Apagomerina gigas
- Arapaima gigas, arapaima, pirarucu, or paiche, a freshwater fish
- Archispirostreptus gigas (synonym), the giant African millipede
- Argyropelecus gigas, giant hatchetfish or greater silver hatchetfish
- Arius gigas
- Athletes gigas, provisionally accepted name; see Athletes (moth)
- Avelia gigas, a karyorelict ciliate in genus Avelia
- Ancyloscelis gigas, a Southern Brazilian bee

== See also ==
- Gigas (disambiguation)
