= A. confinis =

A. confinis may refer to:

- Abacetus confinis, a ground beetle
- Acerentulus confinis, a proturan
- Aethes confinis, a moth found in Bulgaria, Ukraine, and the eastern Palearctic
- Agabus confinis, a predaceous diving beetle found in North America and the Palearctic
- Agoseris confinis, a synonym of Agoseris aurantiaca, a plant found in North America
- Antennaria confinis, a synonym of Antennaria rosea, a plant found in North America
- Aplomya confinis, a tachinid fly found in Europe
- Argyrotaenia confinis, a moth found in Mexico
- Arnica confinis, a synonym of Arnica mollis, a plant found in North America
- Aster confinis, a synonym of Solidago confinis, a plant found in North America
- Atychia confinis, a synonym of Brachodes fulgurita, a moth found in Russia
