= A. azurescens =

A. azurescens may refer to:

- Abacetus azurescens, a ground beetle found in West Africa
- Apagomerina azurescens, a longhorn beetle found in Brazil
  - Apagomera azurescens, a synonym of Apagomerina azurescens
