= A. occultus =

A. occultus may refer to:

- Acerentulus occultus, a species of arthropod
- Anolis occultus, a species of reptile
- Arion occultus, a species of gastropod
- Anthrenus occultus, a species of beetle
- Antrodiaetus occultus, a species of spider in the genus Antrodiaetus
- Aprostocetus occultus, a species of wasp in the genus Aprostocetus
- Aspergillus occultus, a species of fungus
