= H. gigas =

H. gigas may refer to:

- Harpactira gigas, a tarantula native to South Africa
- Hippotragus gigas, an extinct species of antelope
- Holmskioldia gigas, a flowering plant species found in Kenya and Tanzania
- Hyaenodon gigas, an extinct mammal species
- Hydrodamalis gigas, an extinct sirenian
- Hydrodynastes gigas, a rear-fanged venomous colubrid species found in South America
- Hysterocrates gigas, a tarantula native to Cameroon

== See also ==
- Gigas (disambiguation)
