= Gigas =

Gigas may refer to:

- Gigas, one of the Gigantes (Giants) in Greek mythology
- Gigas (company), a Spanish cloud services company
- Guigass, a snow-ape-like kaiju from Ultraman
- Codex Gigas, a medieval manuscript
- gigue or giga, a dance

People

- Erwin Gigas (1899–1976), German geodesist
- Johannes Gigas (1514–1581), German Protestant theologian, hymn writer, educator and Reformer
- Johannes Gigas (cartographer) (1582–1637), German cartographer

== See also ==
- A. gigas (disambiguation)
- D. gigas
- E. gigas (disambiguation)
- G. gigas
- Giygas, a villain in the EarthBound/Mother series
- H. gigas (disambiguation)
- M. gigas (disambiguation)
- P. gigas (disambiguation)
- T. gigas (disambiguation)
