= Acerentulus nemoralis =

Scientific classification
- Kingdom: Animalia
- Phylum: Arthropoda
- Clade: Pancrustacea
- Class: Entognatha
- Order: Protura
- Family: Acerentomidae
- Genus: Acerentulus
- Species: A. nemoralis

Binomial name
- Acerentulus nemoralis Najt & Vidal Sarmiento, 1970

Species of insect-like animal

Acerentulus nemoralis is a species of proturan in the family Acerentomidae. It is found in South America.
