= Acerentulus kisonis =

Scientific classification
- Kingdom: Animalia
- Phylum: Arthropoda
- Clade: Pancrustacea
- Class: Entognatha
- Order: Protura
- Family: Acerentomidae
- Genus: Acerentulus
- Species: A. kisonis

Binomial name
- Acerentulus kisonis Imadaté, 1961

Species of insect-like animal

Acerentulus kisonis is a species of proturan in the family Acerentomidae. It is found in Southern Asia.
