= Acerentulus shrubovychae =

Scientific classification
- Kingdom: Animalia
- Phylum: Arthropoda
- Clade: Pancrustacea
- Class: Entognatha
- Order: Protura
- Family: Acerentomidae
- Genus: Acerentulus
- Species: A. shrubovychae

Binomial name
- Acerentulus shrubovychae Galli & Capurro, 2013

Species of insect-like animal

Acerentulus shrubovychae is a species of proturan in the family Acerentomidae.
