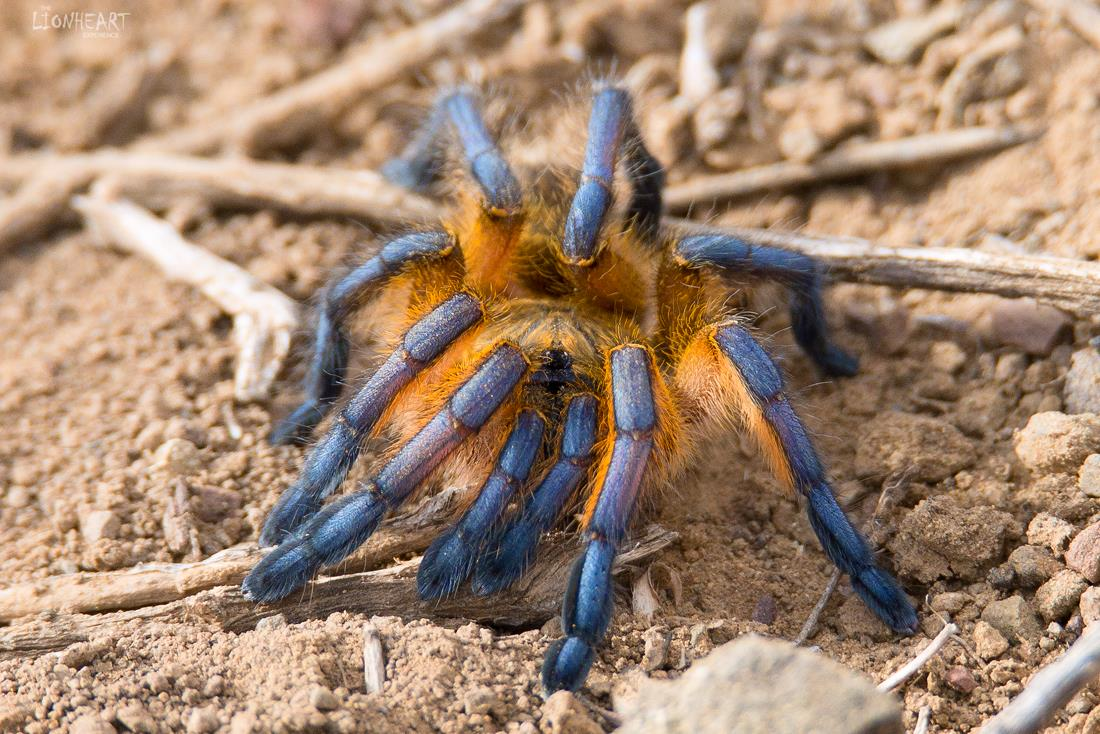

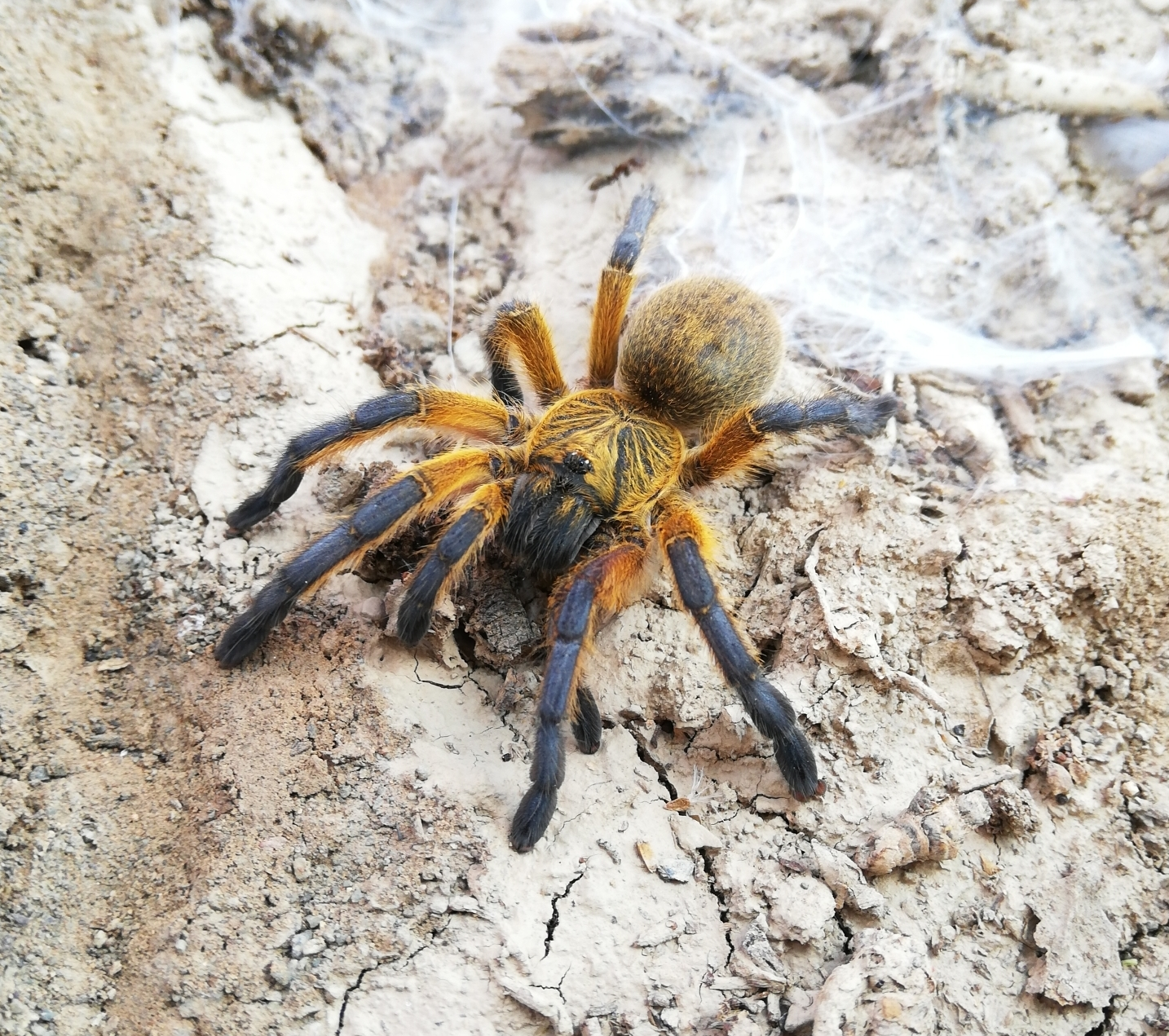

Scientific classification
- Kingdom: Animalia
- Phylum: Arthropoda
- Subphylum: Chelicerata
- Class: Arachnida
- Order: Araneae
- Infraorder: Mygalomorphae
- Family: Theraphosidae
- Genus: Harpactira
- Species: H. pulchripes

Binomial name
- Harpactira pulchripes Pocock, 1901

= Harpactira pulchripes =

Species of spider

Harpactira pulchripes, also known as the golden blue-legged baboon spider, is a bright yellow-bodied and metallic blue-legged tarantula found in South Africa. It was first described by Reginald Innes Pocock in 1901. It is a very highly desired tarantula in the European and American tarantula keeping hobby.

Its specific name pulchripes is derived from Latin "pulchripes" meaning the "beautiful foot".

== Description ==
Harpactira pulchripes has metallic blue legs. This blue color stretches from the tarsus all the way to the trochanter, where it changes to a vivid orange or yellow. Its carapace is orange or yellow with some black patterning which is the same with the opisthosoma. They are sexually dimorphic, as the males have longer legs and duller colors. Females reach a maximum diagonal leg span of 14 cm while males reach 10 cm. Females live to around 12 years, while males only live to 2 to 3 years. This spider has medically significant venom, though there is little information about its strength.

== Habitat ==
This tarantula is found in South Africa in Grahamstown, now known as Makhanda, where its mainly arid with average temperatures of 25 °C, an average yearly rainfall of 628 mm, and an average humidity of 77%, with the average height above sea level being 580 m.

== Behavior ==
This spider is a fossorial Old World tarantula. Though it is part of the Harpactirinae, known for being aggressive, this tarantula is the exception, having a noticeably more relaxed temper than other in its subfamily. They are incredibly fast, though this spider is skittish rather than defensive, which is odd considering their medically significant venom. In addition to their calm demeanor, they spend much of their time on display in their webs.
