= Acerentulus carpaticus =

Scientific classification
- Kingdom: Animalia
- Phylum: Arthropoda
- Clade: Pancrustacea
- Class: Entognatha
- Order: Protura
- Family: Acerentomidae
- Genus: Acerentulus
- Species: A. carpaticus

Binomial name
- Acerentulus carpaticus Nosek, 1967

Species of insect-like animal

Acerentulus carpaticus is an alpine species of proturan in the family Acerentomidae. First described from Slovakia, it is found in Europe and northern Asia (excluding China).
