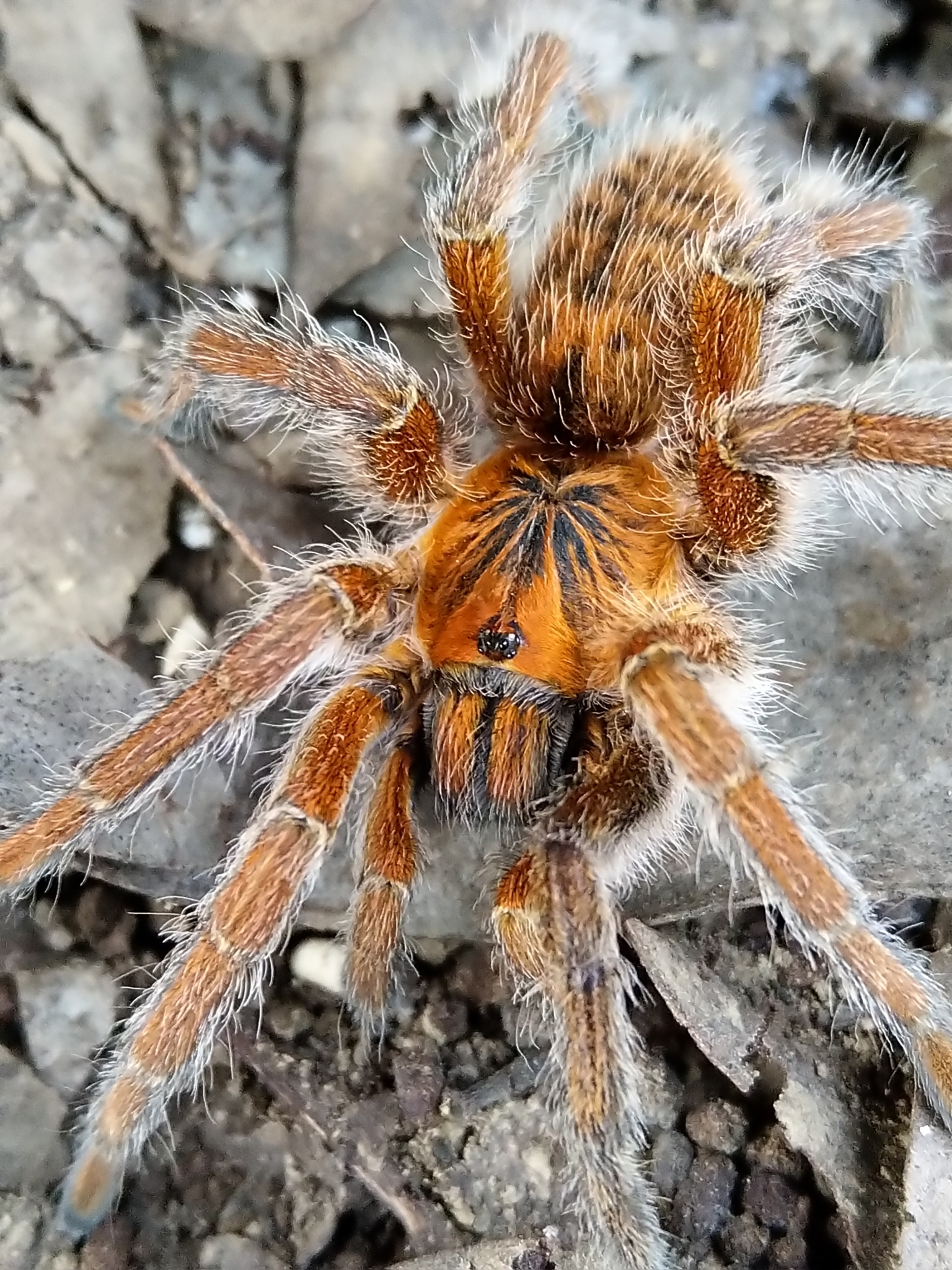

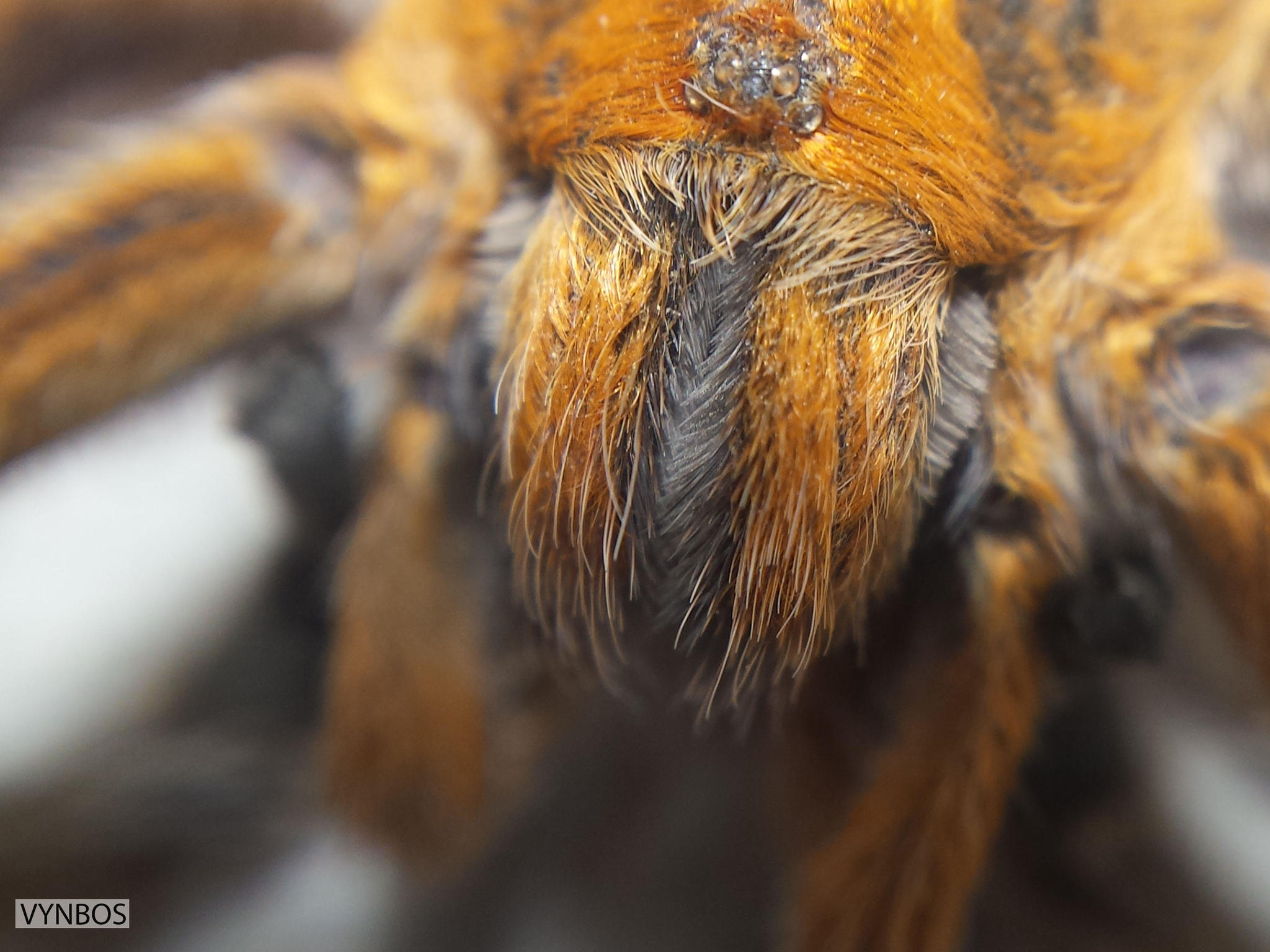

Scientific classification
- Kingdom: Animalia
- Phylum: Arthropoda
- Subphylum: Chelicerata
- Class: Arachnida
- Order: Araneae
- Infraorder: Mygalomorphae
- Family: Theraphosidae
- Genus: Harpactira
- Species: H. cafreriana

Binomial name
- Harpactira cafreriana Walckenaer, 1837

Synonyms
- Mygale cafreriana Walckenaer, 1837; Mygale villosa Walckenaer, 1837

= Harpactira cafreriana =

Cape copper baboon

Species of tarantula

Harpactira cafreriana otherwise known as the Cape copper baboon or amber baboon tarantula spider was first described by Charles Athanase Walckenaer in 1837. It is found in South Africa, being terrestrial or semi-fossorial in nature.

== Description ==
=== Females ===
Females of this species live from around 10 to 12 years under proper care, owning a far duller coloration than what can be seen in the males. Most of the body is a dark brown or grey color, covered with copper coloration all around the body, being stronger the closer it is to the carapace. Alongside the males, this tarantula is covered in grayish hairs.

=== Male ===
Males live from around 2 to 3 years under proper care, they own a far more brighter coloration than the females looking to be almost golden in coloration. All their body is the same coloration, although owning some black striping in the carapace and a black fish bone patter in the opisthosoma, which are covered in grey hairs alongside the legs.

== Habitat ==
This section will be based on Bontebok National Park, as it's close to the type locality of this species. This Black wattle area has a temperate climate, with an average of 377mm of yearly rainfall. The average temperature is 20°C with animals such as Cape Fox, Bontebok and Aardwolf. With plants such as Breede River Yellowwood, Black Wattle and Sweet Thorn, making it a pretty diverse area.

== Behavior ==
They are terrestrial tarantulas, sometimes showing semi-fossorial behavior, they web quite a lot and are usually visible. They are surprisingly calm considering they are part of the Harpactirinae subfamily, though when scared they are fast and will run away instead of being defensive.
