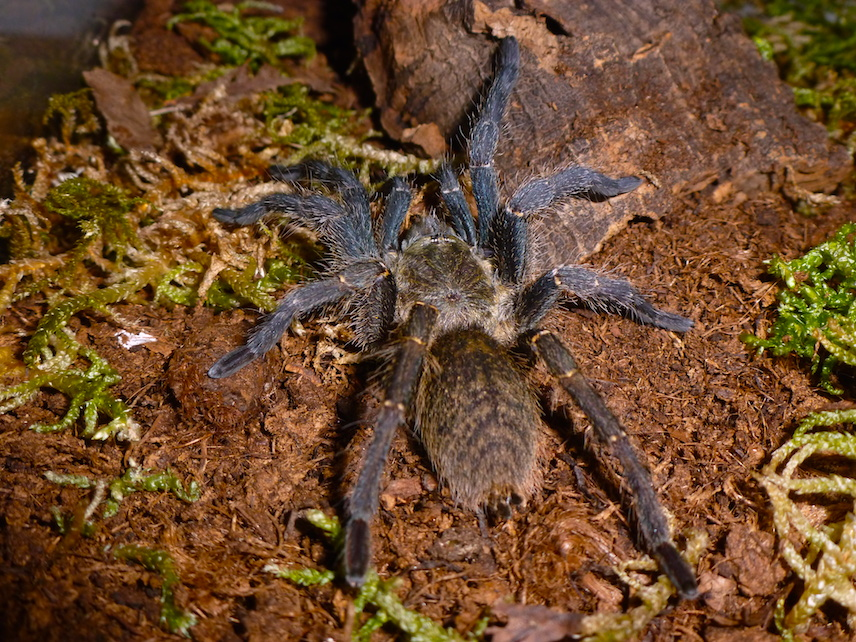
- H. marksi
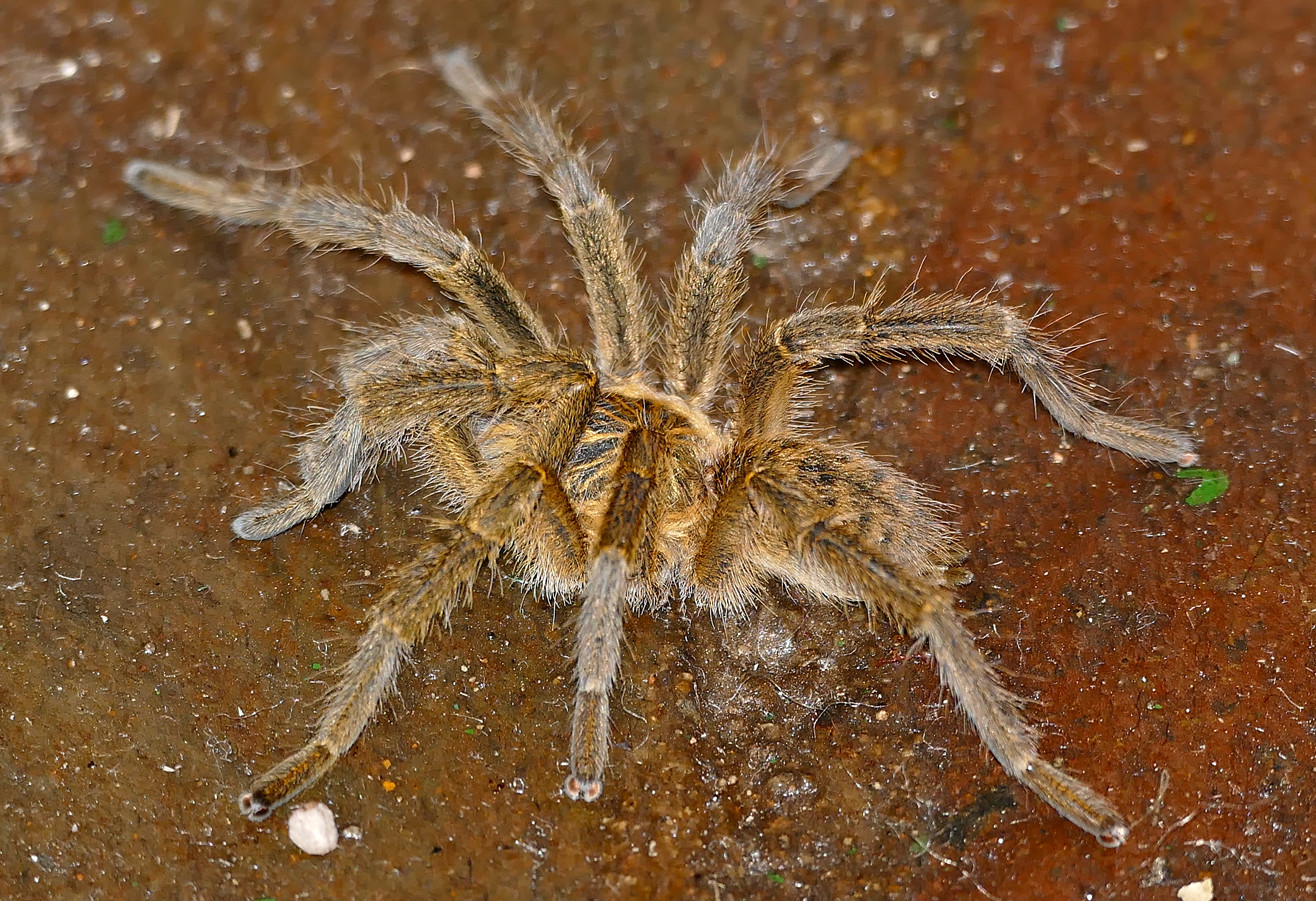
- H. tigrina

Scientific classification
- Kingdom: Animalia
- Phylum: Arthropoda
- Subphylum: Chelicerata
- Class: Arachnida
- Order: Araneae
- Infraorder: Mygalomorphae
- Family: Theraphosidae
- Genus: Harpactira; Ausserer, 1871

Type species
- H. atra (Latreille, 1832)

Species
- 15, see text

= Harpactira =

Genus of spiders

Harpactira is a genus of African tarantulas that was first described by Anton Ausserer in 1871.

All described species are endemic to South Africa, with the exception of H. namaquensis, which is also found in Namibia.

== Species ==
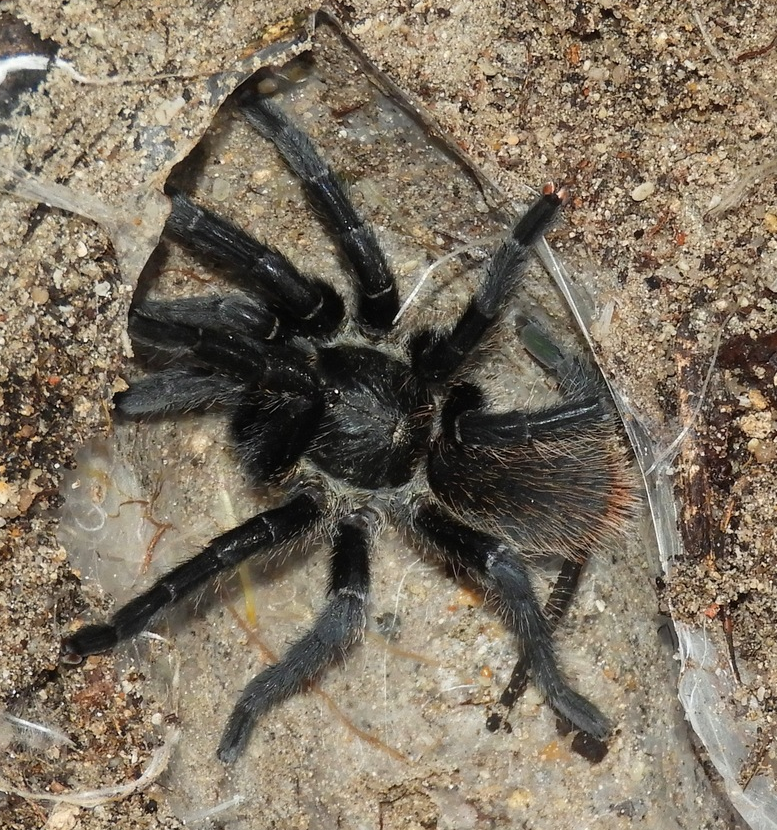
H. atra

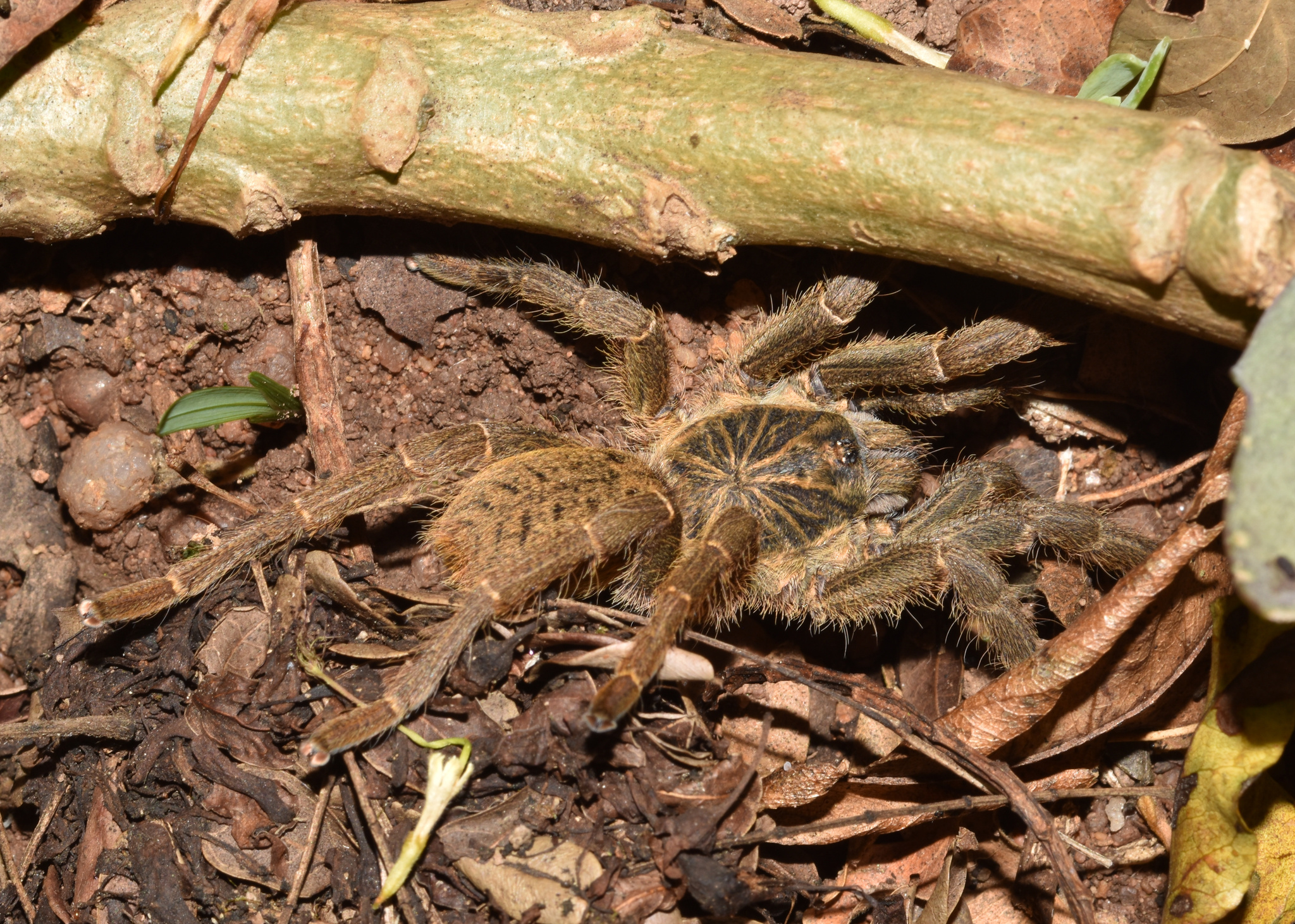
H. curator

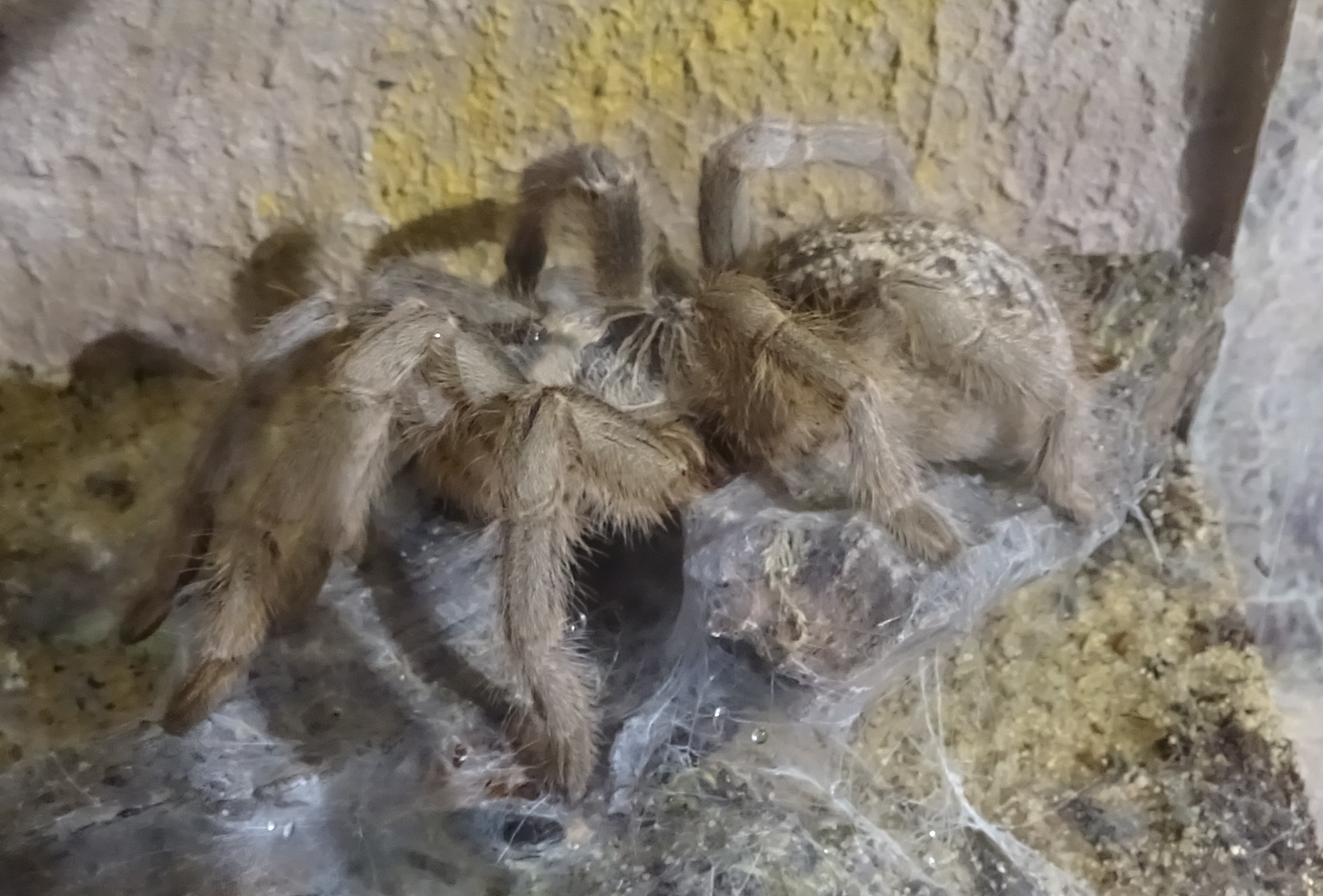
H. dictator

As of October 2025, this genus includes fifteen species:

- Harpactira atra (Latreille, 1832) – South Africa (type species)
- Harpactira baviana Purcell, 1903 – South Africa
- Harpactira cafreriana (Walckenaer, 1837) – South Africa
- Harpactira chrysogaster Pocock, 1897 – South Africa
- Harpactira curator Pocock, 1898 – South Africa
- Harpactira curvipes Pocock, 1897 – South Africa
- Harpactira dictator Purcell, 1902 – South Africa
- Harpactira gigas Pocock, 1898 – South Africa
- Harpactira hamiltoni Pocock, 1902 – South Africa
- Harpactira lineata Pocock, 1897 – South Africa
- Harpactira lyrata (Simon, 1892) – South Africa
- Harpactira marksi Purcell, 1902 – South Africa
- Harpactira namaquensis Purcell, 1902 – Namibia, South Africa
- Harpactira pulchripes Pocock, 1901 – South Africa
- Harpactira tigrina Ausserer, 1875 – South Africa
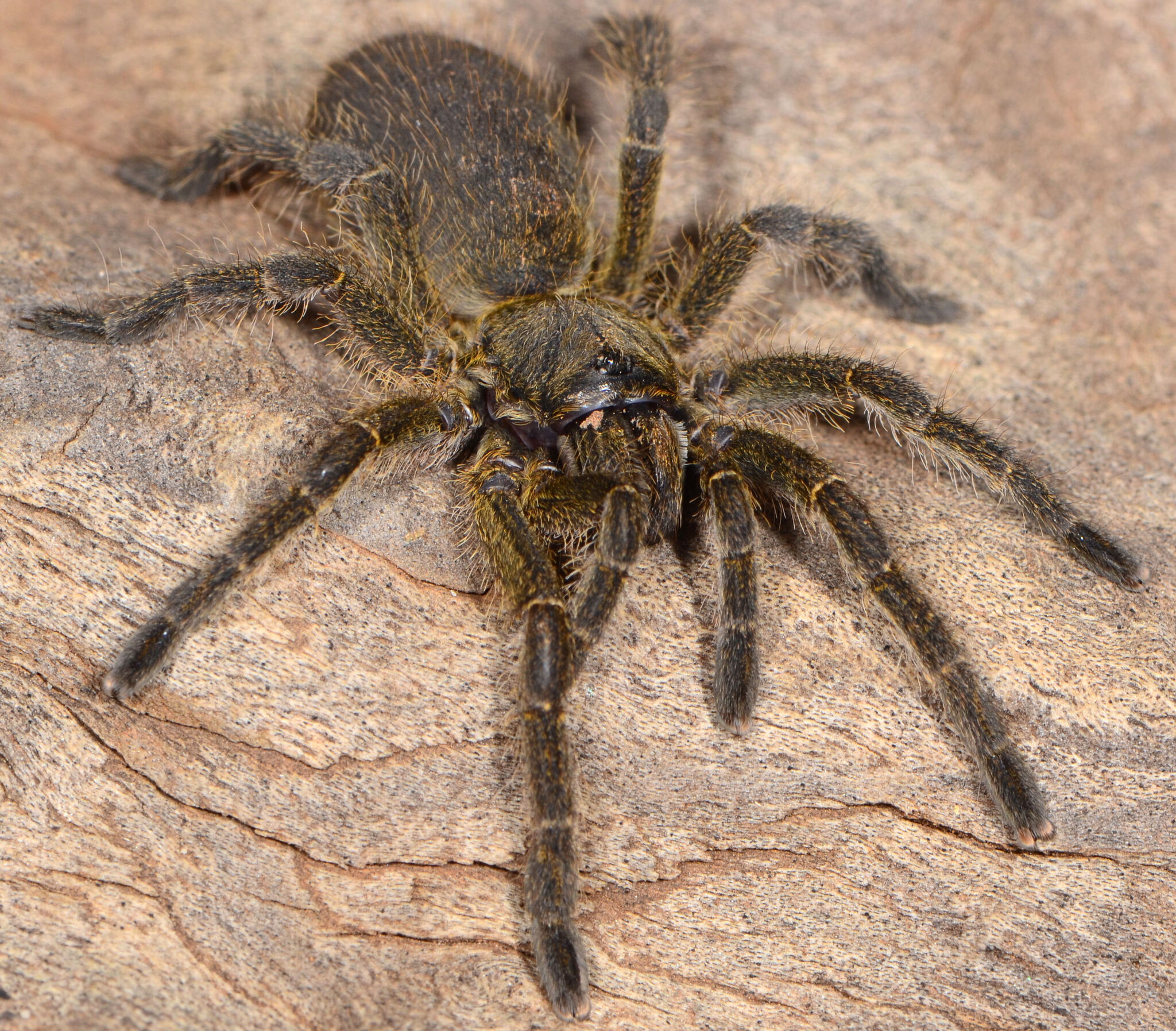
female H. hamiltoni

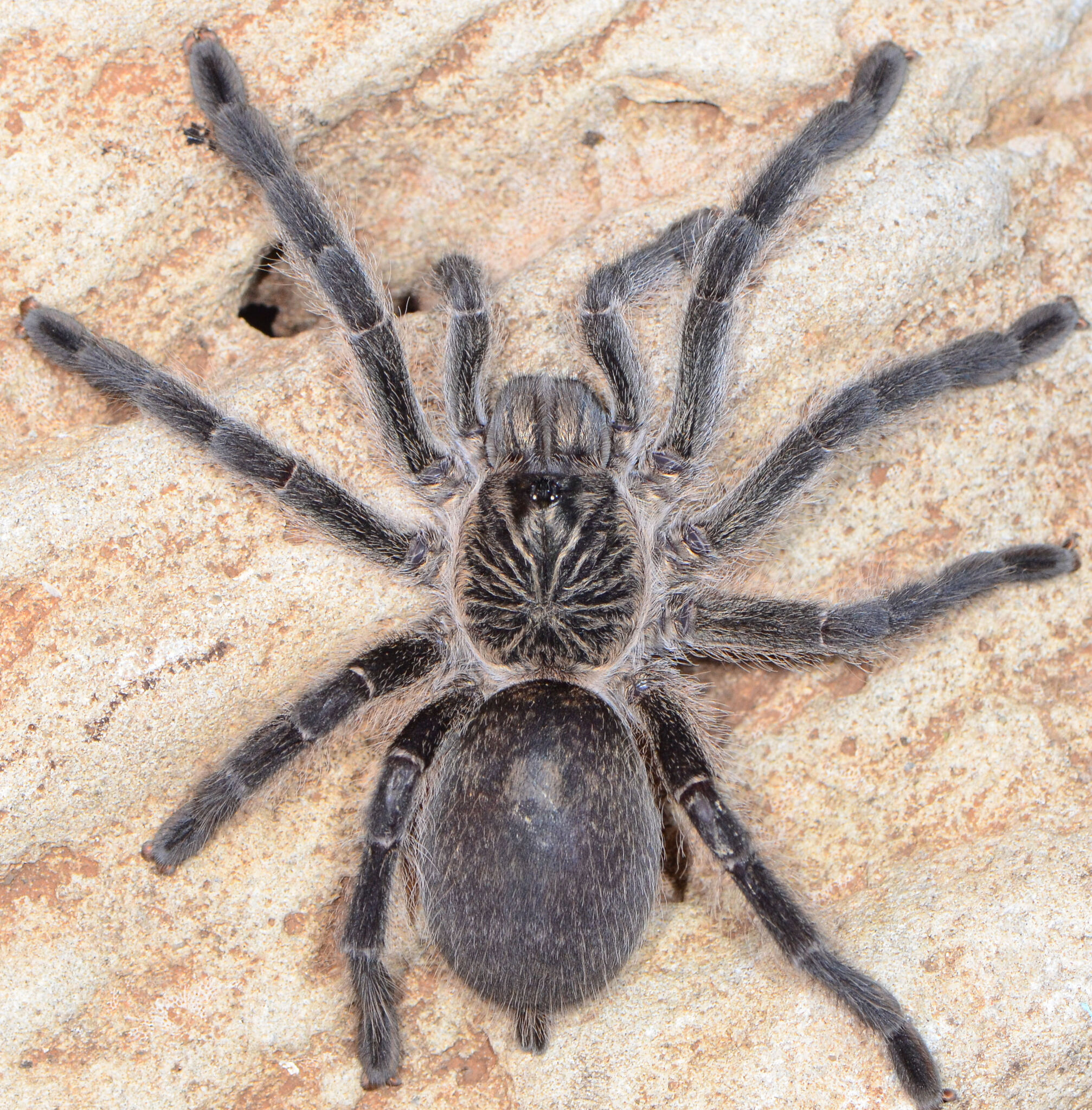
female H. namaquensis

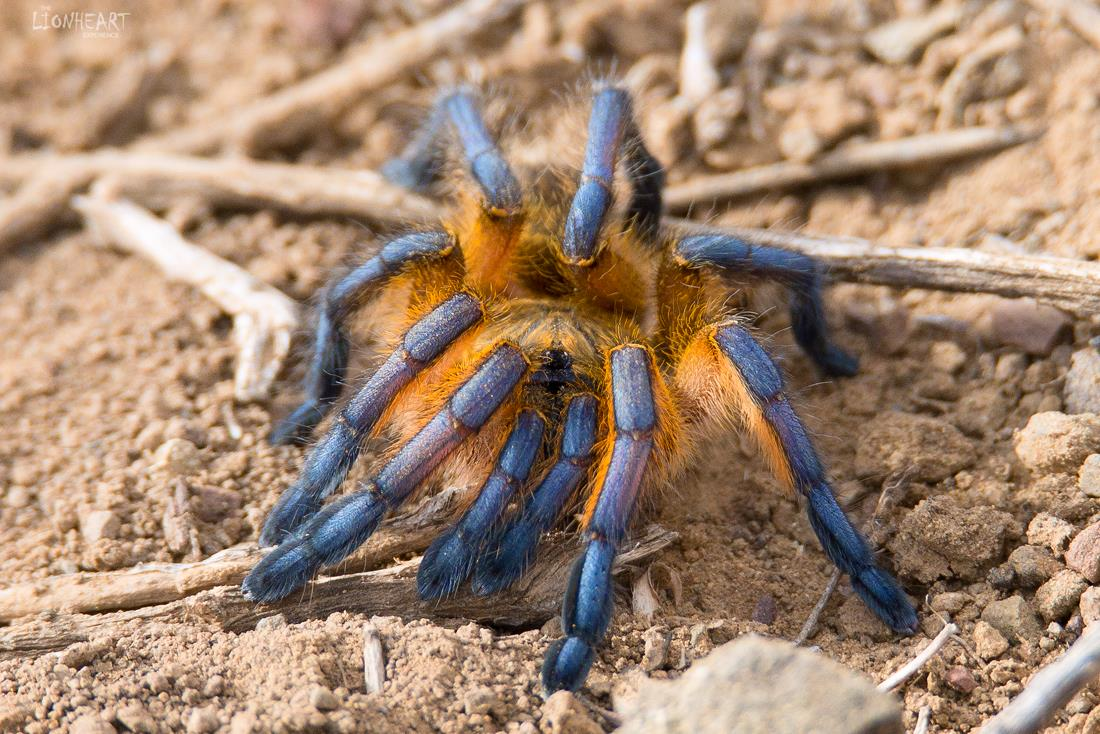
H. pulchripes
