= T. gigas =

T. gigas may refer to:

- Tachypleus gigas, an Asian species of horseshoe crab
- Thamnophis gigas, the giant garter snake, a reptile of the western United States
- Thesprotia gigas, the grass mantis, a praying mantis species found in Brazil
- Tridacna gigas, the giant clam or pa’ua, the largest living bivalve mollusk species
- Tapinauchenius plumipes, a South American tarantula with the synonym Tapinauchenius gigas

== See also ==
- Gigas (disambiguation)
