= E. gigas =

E. gigas may refer to:

- Entada gigas, the cœur de la mer or sea heart, a flowering liana species native to Central America, the Caribbean, northern South America and Africa
- Eustrombus gigas, the queen conch, a very large edible sea snail species

== See also ==
- Gigas (disambiguation)
