= Apagomerina flava =

Scientific classification
- Domain: Eukaryota
- Kingdom: Animalia
- Phylum: Arthropoda
- Class: Insecta
- Order: Coleoptera
- Suborder: Polyphaga
- Infraorder: Cucujiformia
- Family: Cerambycidae
- Tribe: Hemilophini
- Genus: Apagomerina
- Species: A. flava

Binomial name
- Apagomerina flava Galileo & Martins, 1989

Species of beetle

Apagomerina flava is a species of beetle in the family Cerambycidae. It was described by Galileo and Martins in 1989. It is known from Brazil.
