= Apagomerina erythronota =

Scientific classification
- Domain: Eukaryota
- Kingdom: Animalia
- Phylum: Arthropoda
- Class: Insecta
- Order: Coleoptera
- Suborder: Polyphaga
- Infraorder: Cucujiformia
- Family: Cerambycidae
- Tribe: Hemilophini
- Genus: Apagomerina
- Species: A. erythronota

Binomial name
- Apagomerina erythronota (Lane, 1970)

Synonyms
- Xenonta erythronota Lane, 1970

Species of beetle

Apagomerina erythronota is a species of beetle in the family Cerambycidae. It was described by Lane in 1970. It is known from Brazil.
