= Acerentulus =

Scientific classification
- Domain: Eukaryota
- Kingdom: Animalia
- Phylum: Arthropoda
- Order: Protura
- Family: Acerentomidae
- Genus: Acerentulus; Berlese, 1908

Genus of insect-like animals

Acerentulus is a genus of proturans in the family Acerentomidae.

== Species ==
- Acerentulus alni Szeptycki, 1991
- Acerentulus alpinus Gisin, 1945
- Acerentulus americanus Hilton, 1943
- Acerentulus apuliacus Rusek & Stumpp, 1988
- Acerentulus aubertoti Condé, 1944
- Acerentulus berruezanus Aldaba, 1983
- Acerentulus carpaticus Nosek, 1967
- Acerentulus cassagnaui Nosek, 1969
- Acerentulus catalanus Condé, 1951
- Acerentulus collaris Szeptycki, 1991
- Acerentulus condei Nosek, 1983
- Acerentulus confinis Berlese, 1908
- Acerentulus correzeanus Szeptycki, 1997
- Acerentulus cunhai Condé, 1950
- Acerentulus exiguus Condé, 1944
- Acerentulus gerezianus da Cunha, 1952
- Acerentulus gigas Szeptycki, 1997
- Acerentulus gisini Condé, 1952
- Acerentulus halae Szeptycki, 1997
- Acerentulus insignis Condé, 1945
- Acerentulus keikoae Imadaté, 1988
- Acerentulus kermadecensis Ramsay & Tuxen, 1978
- Acerentulus kisonis Imadaté, 1961
- Acerentulus ladeiroi da Cunha, 1950
- Acerentulus minutus Loksa, 1966
- Acerentulus nemoralis Najt & Vidal Sarmiento, 1970
- Acerentulus occultus Szeptycki, 1979
- Acerentulus ochsenchausenus Rusek, 1988
- Acerentulus omoi Imadaté, 1988
- Acerentulus palissai Nosek, 1967
- Acerentulus proximus Szeptycki, 1997
- Acerentulus rafalskii Szeptycki, 1979
- Acerentulus rapoporti Condé, 1963
- Acerentulus ruseki Nosek, 1967
- Acerentulus seabrai da Cunha, 1952
- Acerentulus setosus Szeptycki, 1993
- Acerentulus sexspinatus Womersley, 1936
- Acerentulus shensiensis Chou & Yang, 1964
- Acerentulus shrubovychae Galli & Capurro, 2013
- Acerentulus silvanus Szeptycki, 1991
- Acerentulus terricola Rusek, 1965
- Acerentulus tolosanus Nosek, 1969
- Acerentulus traegardhi Ionesco, 1937
- Acerentulus tuxeni Rusek, 1966
- Acerentulus xerophilus Szeptycki, 1979
