= Acerentulus silvanus =

Scientific classification
- Kingdom: Animalia
- Phylum: Arthropoda
- Clade: Pancrustacea
- Class: Entognatha
- Order: Protura
- Family: Acerentomidae
- Genus: Acerentulus
- Species: A. silvanus

Binomial name
- Acerentulus silvanus Szeptycki, 1991

Species of insect-like animal

Acerentulus silvanus is a species of proturan in the family Acerentomidae. It is found in Africa, Europe, and Northern Asia (excluding China).
