= Apagomerina =

Scientific classification
- Domain: Eukaryota
- Kingdom: Animalia
- Phylum: Arthropoda
- Class: Insecta
- Order: Coleoptera
- Suborder: Polyphaga
- Infraorder: Cucujiformia
- Family: Cerambycidae
- Subfamily: Lamiinae
- Tribe: Hemilophini
- Genus: Apagomerina; Gilmour, 1962

Genus of beetles

Apagomerina is a genus of longhorn beetles of the subfamily Lamiinae, containing the following species:

- Apagomerina apicalis Galileo & Martins, 2001
- Apagomerina azurescens (Bates, 1881)
- Apagomerina diadela Martins & Galileo, 1996
- Apagomerina erythronota (Lane, 1970)
- Apagomerina faceta Martins & Galileo, 2007
- Apagomerina flava Galileo & Martins, 1989
- Apagomerina gigas Martins & Galileo, 2007
- Apagomerina ignea Martins & Galileo, 1996
- Apagomerina jucunda Martins & Galileo, 1984
- Apagomerina lampyroides Martins & Galileo, 2007
- Apagomerina lepida Martins & Galileo, 1996
- Apagomerina odettae Martins & Galileo, 2007
- Apagomerina rubricollis Galileo & Martins, 1992
- Apagomerina subtilis Martins & Galileo, 1996
- Apagomerina unica Martins & Galileo, 1996
- Apagomerina utiariti Galileo & Martins, 1989
