= P. gigas =

P. gigas may refer to:

- Pangasianodon gigas, the Mekong giant catfish
- Patagona gigas, the giant hummingbird, a bird species
- Phascolonus gigas, a prehistoric Australian marsupial species
- Phelsuma gigas, the Rodrigues giant day gecko, an extinct diurnal gecko species that lived on the island of Rodrigues
- Paracamelus gigas, an extinct camelid in the genus Paracamelus.
- Praearcturus gigas, an extinct genus of arthropod, possibly a large scorpion.

== See also ==
- Gigas (disambiguation)
