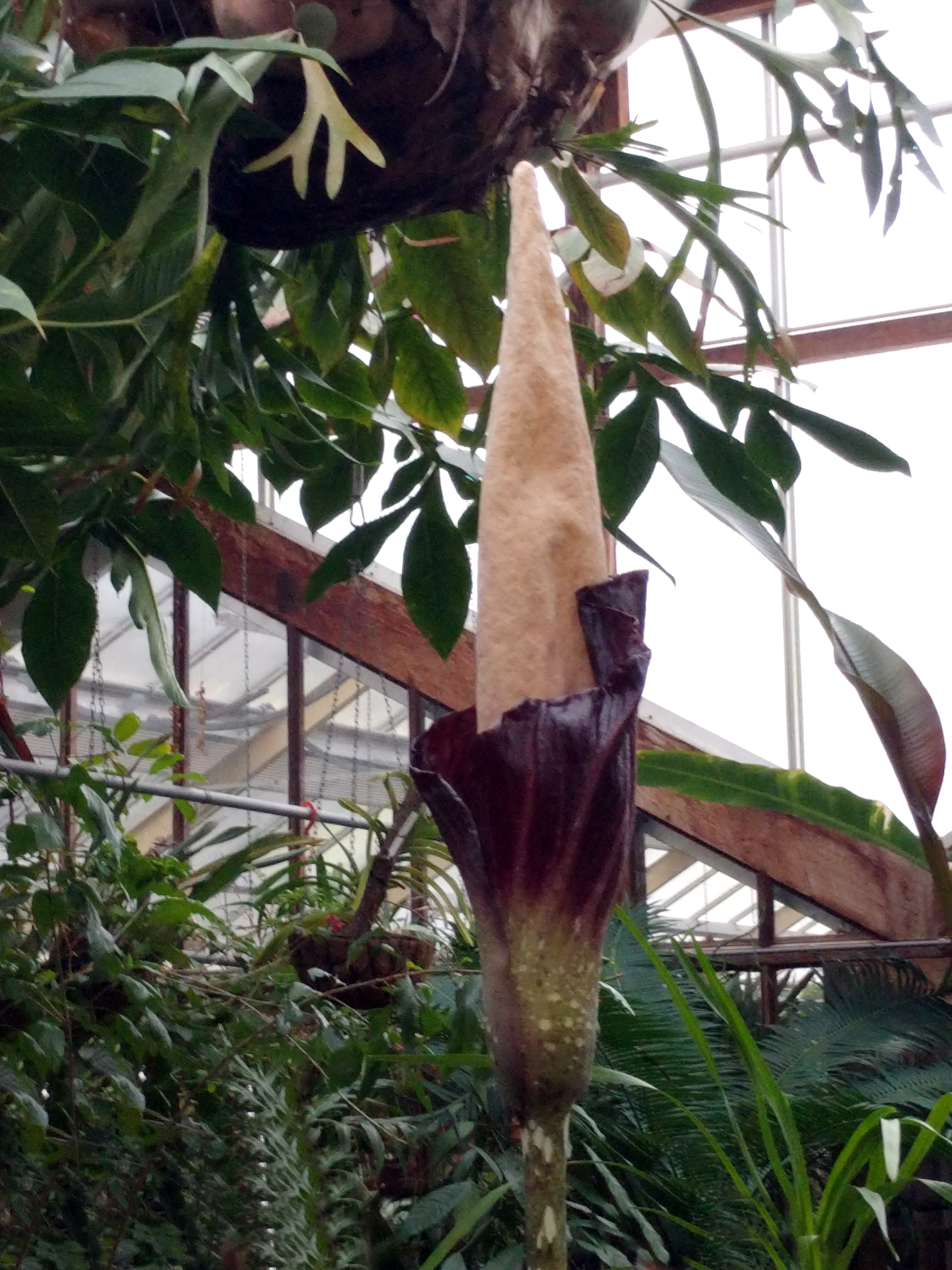
- Inflorescence at Hortus Botanicus

Scientific classification
- Kingdom: Plantae
- Clade: Embryophytes
- Clade: Tracheophytes
- Clade: Angiosperms
- Clade: Monocots
- Order: Alismatales
- Family: Araceae
- Genus: Amorphophallus
- Species: A. decus-silvae

Binomial name
- Amorphophallus decus-silvae Backer & Alderw. 1863

= Amorphophallus decus-silvae =

Species of plant native to Indonesia

Amorphophallus decus-silvae, known as the West-Java giant amorphophallus, is a flowering plant in the family Araceae. It is native to West Java and was first described by Dutch botanist Cornelis Andries Backer in 1863.

== Description ==
A. decus-silvae produces large phallic-shaped inflorescences. The inflorescence can reach up to 3.5 m (11 ft) tall. It resembles its relatives Amorphophallus titanum and Amorphophallus gigas in having a large spathe and spadix.

A. decus-silvae flowers rarely and for only a few days. Similar to other species in the Amorphophallus genus, A. decus-silvae has the smell of rotten flesh to attract pollinators such as flesh flies. It has a large corm which stores energy.
