= Apagomerina odettae =

Scientific classification
- Domain: Eukaryota
- Kingdom: Animalia
- Phylum: Arthropoda
- Class: Insecta
- Order: Coleoptera
- Suborder: Polyphaga
- Infraorder: Cucujiformia
- Family: Cerambycidae
- Tribe: Hemilophini
- Genus: Apagomerina
- Species: A. odettae

Binomial name
- Apagomerina odettae Martins & Galileo, 2007

Species of beetle

Apagomerina odettae is a species of beetle in the family Cerambycidae. It was described by Martins and Galileo in 2007. It is known from French Guiana.
