= Acerentulus apuliacus =

Scientific classification
- Kingdom: Animalia
- Phylum: Arthropoda
- Clade: Pancrustacea
- Class: Entognatha
- Order: Protura
- Family: Acerentomidae
- Genus: Acerentulus
- Species: A. apuliacus

Binomial name
- Acerentulus apuliacus Rusek & Stumpp, 1988

Species of insect-like animal

Acerentulus apuliacus is a species of proturan in the family Acerentomidae. It is found in Europe and northern Asia (excluding China).
