= Aplomya =

Scientific classification
- Kingdom: Animalia
- Phylum: Arthropoda
- Class: Insecta
- Order: Diptera
- Family: Tachinidae
- Subfamily: Exoristinae
- Tribe: Eryciini
- Genus: Aplomya; Robineau-Desvoidy, 1830

Type species
- Aplomya zonata Robineau-Desvoidy, 1830

Synonyms
- Aplomyia Agassiz, 1846; Aplomyiella Mesnil, 1939; Atricholyga Villeneuve, 1939; Haplomyia Agassiz, 1846; Leiosia Wulp, 1893; Prozenillia Villeneuve, 1916; Wiedemanniomyia Townsend, 1933

Genus of flies

Aplomya is a genus of flies in the family Tachinidae.

== Species ==
- Aplomya abdominalis Robineau-Desvoidy, 1863
- Aplomya atra Robineau-Desvoidy, 1863
- Aplomya aurea Robineau-Desvoidy, 1863
- Aplomya campestris Robineau-Desvoidy, 1863
- Aplomya confinis (Fallén, 1820)
- Aplomya conglomerata (Walker, 1859)
- Aplomya distans (Villeneuve, 1916)
- Aplomya distincta (Baranov, 1931)
- Aplomya flavisquama (Wulp, 1893)
- Aplomya impavida Robineau-Desvoidy, 1863
- Aplomya integra Robineau-Desvoidy, 1863
- Aplomya latimana Villeneuve, 1934
- Aplomya lycaena (Curran, 1927)
- Aplomya metallica (Wiedemann, 1824)
- Aplomya poultoni (Villeneuve, 1922)
- Aplomya sellersi (Thompson, 1966)
- Aplomya seyrigi Mesnil, 1954
- Aplomya theclarum (Scudder, 1887)
- Aplomya versicolor (Curran, 1927)
