= Apagomerina utiariti =

Scientific classification
- Domain: Eukaryota
- Kingdom: Animalia
- Phylum: Arthropoda
- Class: Insecta
- Order: Coleoptera
- Suborder: Polyphaga
- Infraorder: Cucujiformia
- Family: Cerambycidae
- Tribe: Hemilophini
- Genus: Apagomerina
- Species: A. utiariti

Binomial name
- Apagomerina utiariti Galileo & Martins, 1989

Species of beetle

Apagomerina utiariti is a species of beetle in the family Cerambycidae. It was described by Galileo and Martins in 1989. It is known from Brazil.
