= Apagomerina subtilis =

Scientific classification
- Domain: Eukaryota
- Kingdom: Animalia
- Phylum: Arthropoda
- Class: Insecta
- Order: Coleoptera
- Suborder: Polyphaga
- Infraorder: Cucujiformia
- Family: Cerambycidae
- Tribe: Hemilophini
- Genus: Apagomerina
- Species: A. subtilis

Binomial name
- Apagomerina subtilis Martins & Galileo, 1996

Species of beetle

Apagomerina subtilis is a species of beetle in the family Cerambycidae. It was described by Martins and Galileo in 1996. It is known from Brazil.
