= Acerentulus keikoae =

Scientific classification
- Kingdom: Animalia
- Phylum: Arthropoda
- Clade: Pancrustacea
- Class: Entognatha
- Order: Protura
- Family: Acerentomidae
- Genus: Acerentulus
- Species: A. keikoae

Binomial name
- Acerentulus keikoae Imadaté, 1988

Species of insect-like animal

Acerentulus keikoae is a species of proturan in the family Acerentomidae. It is found in Southern Asia.

== Subspecies ==
These two subspecies belong to the species Acerentulus keikoae:

- Acerentulus keikoae capillatus Imadaté, 1988
- Acerentulus keikoae keikoae Imadaté, 1988
