= M. gigas =

M. gigas may refer to:

- Marginellona gigas, a deepwater sea snail species
- Mawsonia gigas, an extinct fish species
- Manospondylus gigas, the original name for Tyrannosaurus rex
- Meraxes gigas, a giant predatory dinosaur with short arms like Tyrannosaurus rex

== See also ==
- Gigas (disambiguation)
