= Acerentulus rapoporti =

Scientific classification
- Kingdom: Animalia
- Phylum: Arthropoda
- Clade: Pancrustacea
- Class: Entognatha
- Order: Protura
- Family: Acerentomidae
- Genus: Acerentulus
- Species: A. rapoporti

Binomial name
- Acerentulus rapoporti Condé, 1963

Species of insect-like animal

Acerentulus rapoporti is a species of proturan in the family Acerentomidae. It is found in South America.
