= D. gigas =

The binomial abbreviation D. gigas may refer to:

- Dosidicus gigas, the humboldt squid
- Dinomyrmex gigas, the giant forest ant
