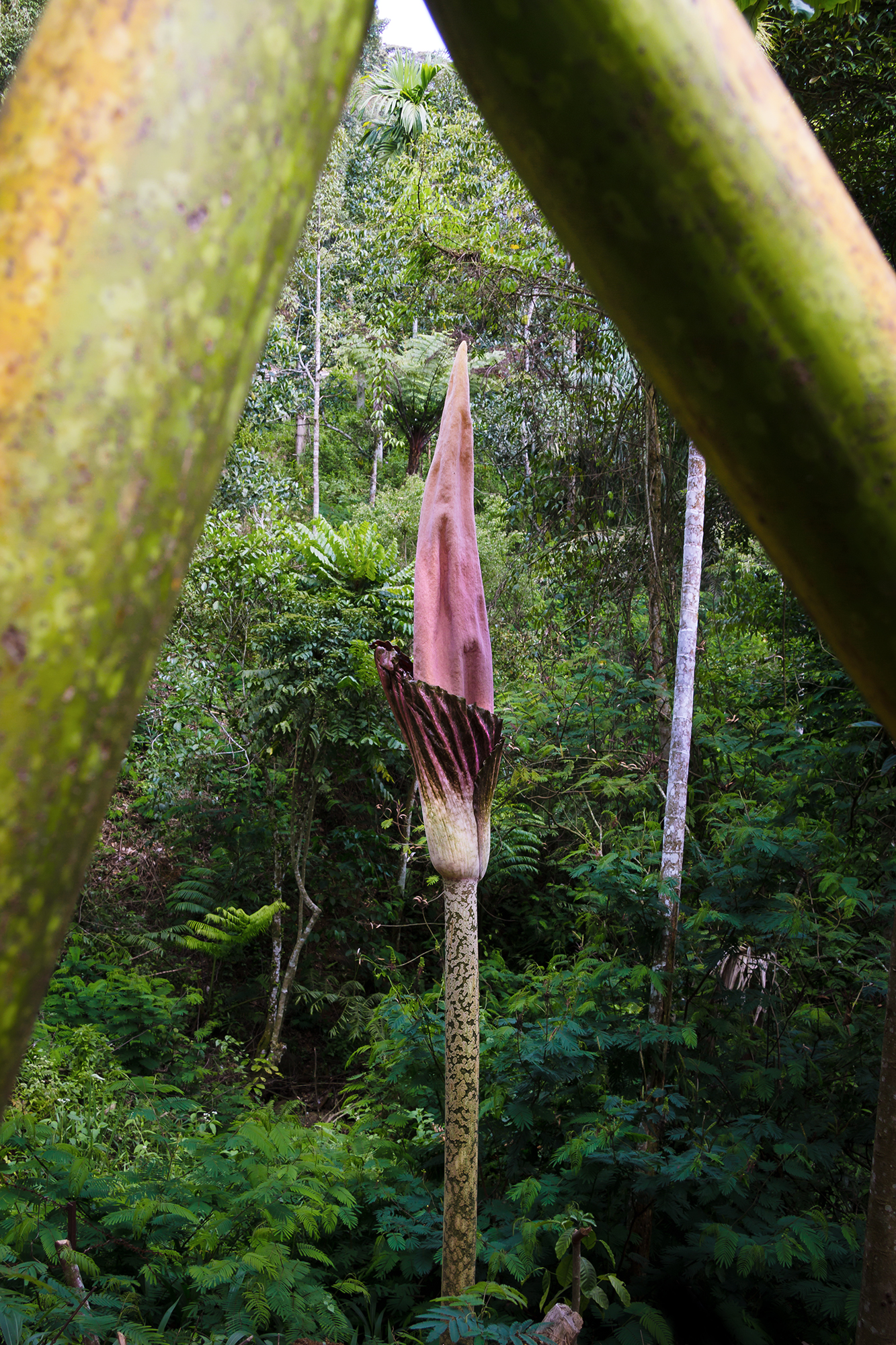

Scientific classification
- Kingdom: Plantae
- Clade: Tracheophytes
- Clade: Angiosperms
- Clade: Monocots
- Order: Alismatales
- Family: Araceae
- Genus: Amorphophallus
- Species: A. gigas

Binomial name
- Amorphophallus gigas Teijsm. & Binn.

Synonyms
- Conophallus gigas (Teijsm. & Binn.) Miq.; Amorphophallus brooksii Alderw.

= Amorphophallus gigas =

Species of plant

Amorphophallus gigas is a plant in the arum family Araceae, native to Sumatra. It is also known as Amorphophallus brooksii. It resembles its near relatives Amorphophallus titanum and Amorphophallus decus-silvae in having a very large spadix surrounded by a very large spathe. In these species the inflorescence can be up to 3.4 m (11 ft) in height, has the smell of rotting flesh, and is fly pollinated. According to Bown, the record specimen was 4.36 m (14.3 ft) in height, of which 1.5 m (4 ft 11 in) was the spadix. The tuber, a corm, is second in size only to A. titanum at up to 70 kg (11 st 0 lb) in weight.

== Gallery ==
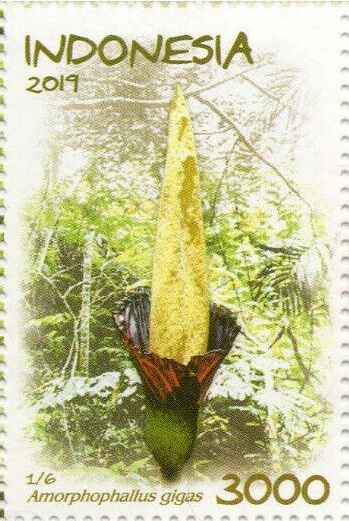
Illustration of flower

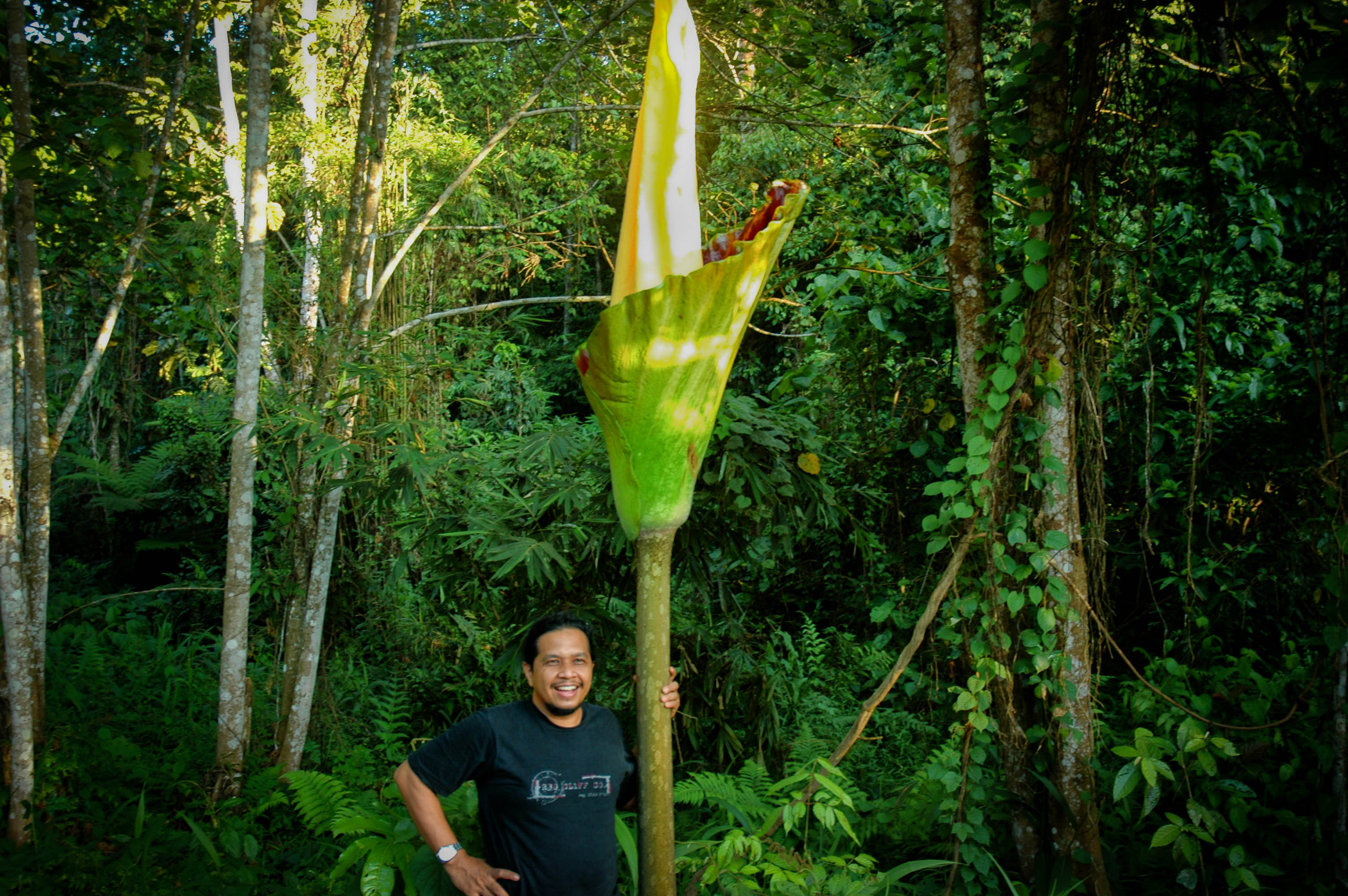
Flower in Sumatra

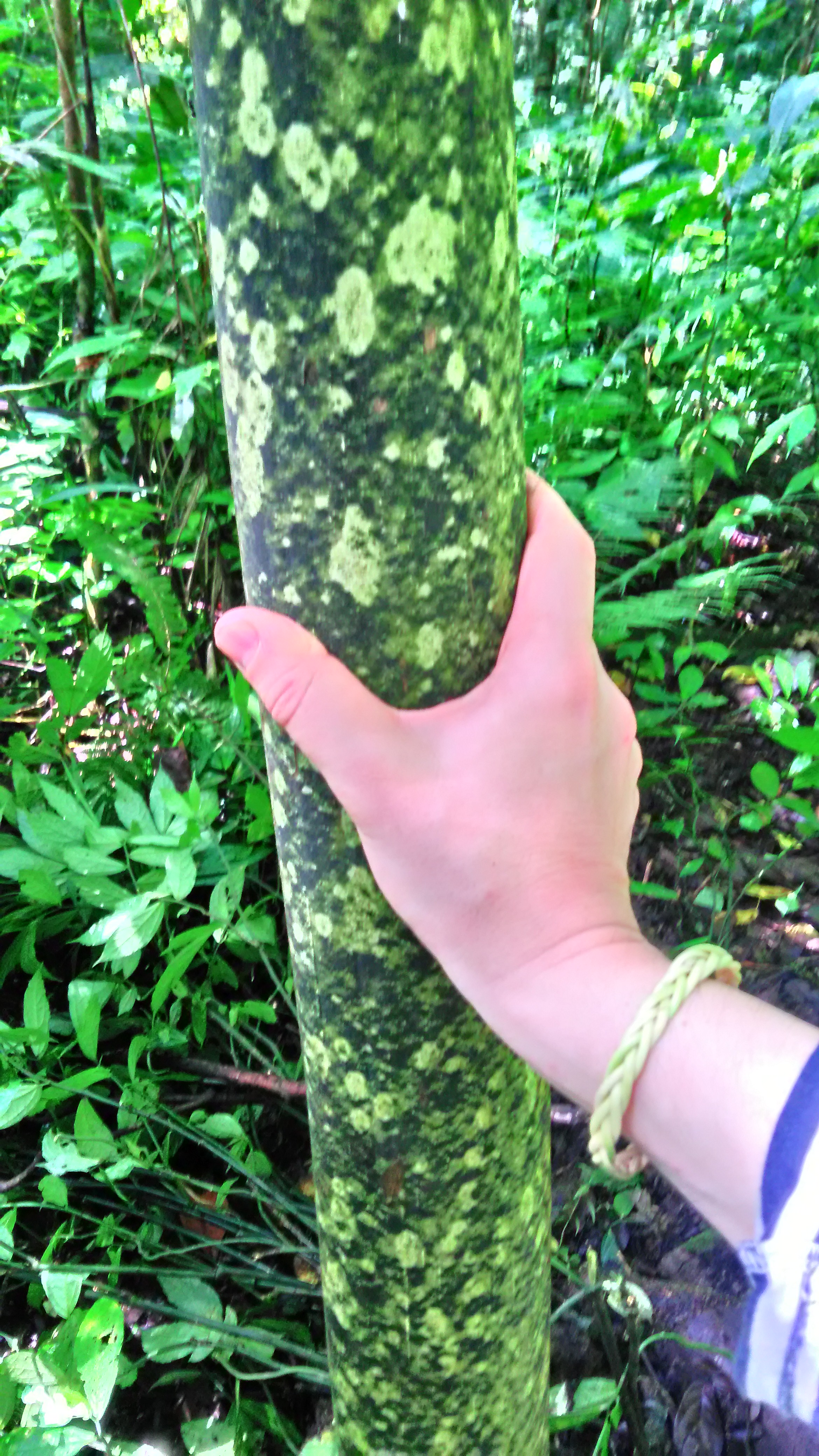
Stem

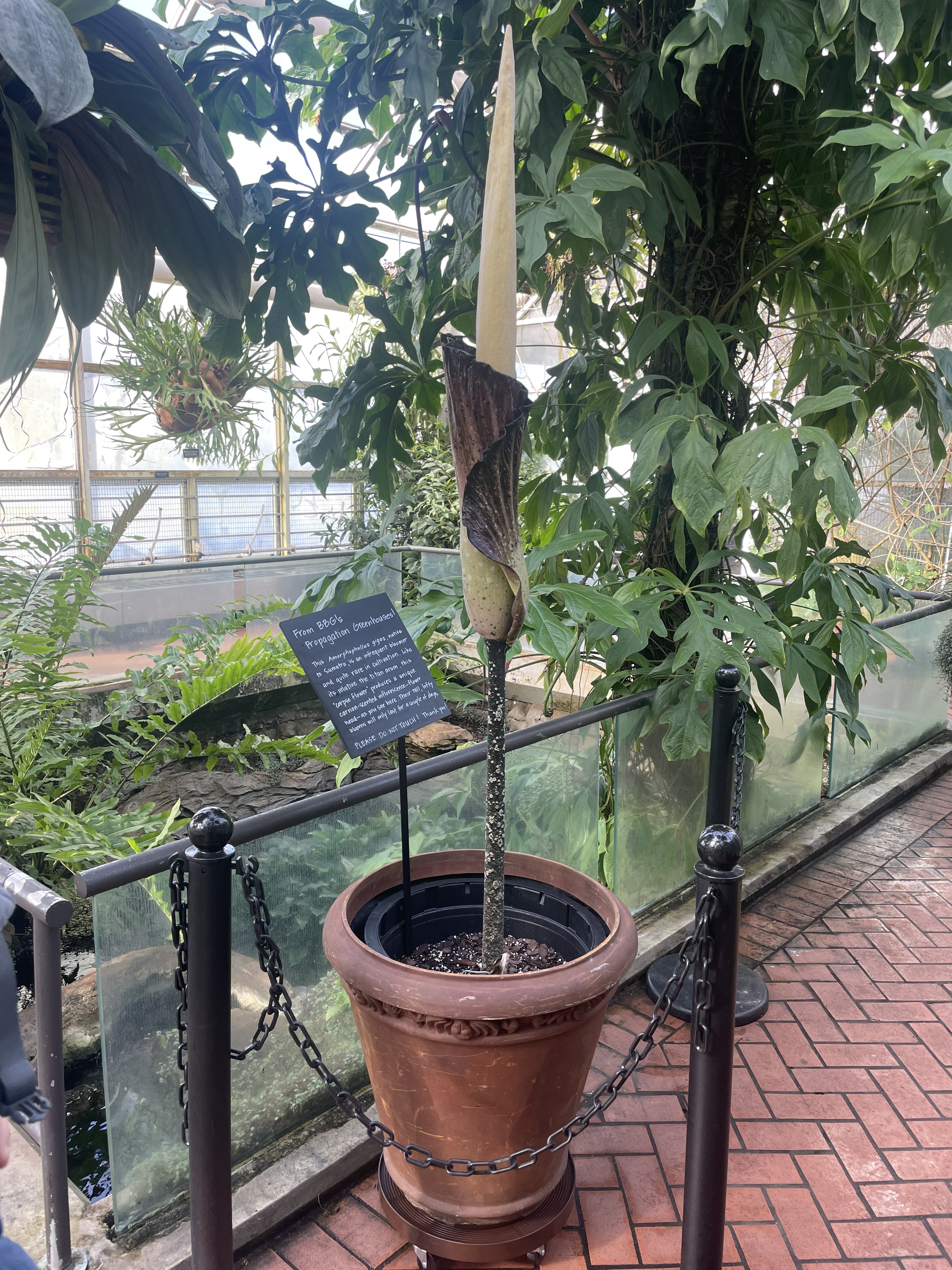
Immature flower
