= Acerentulus confinis =

Scientific classification
- Kingdom: Animalia
- Phylum: Arthropoda
- Clade: Pancrustacea
- Class: Entognatha
- Order: Protura
- Family: Acerentomidae
- Genus: Acerentulus
- Species: A. confinis

Binomial name
- Acerentulus confinis (Berlese, 1908)

Species of insect-like animal

Acerentulus confinis is a species of proturan in the family Acerentomidae. It is found in Africa, Australia, Europe and Northern Asia (excluding China), and North America.

== Subspecies ==
These two subspecies belong to the species Acerentulus confinis:

- Acerentulus confinis confinis (Berlese, 1908)
- Acerentulus confinis maderensis Tuxen, 1982
