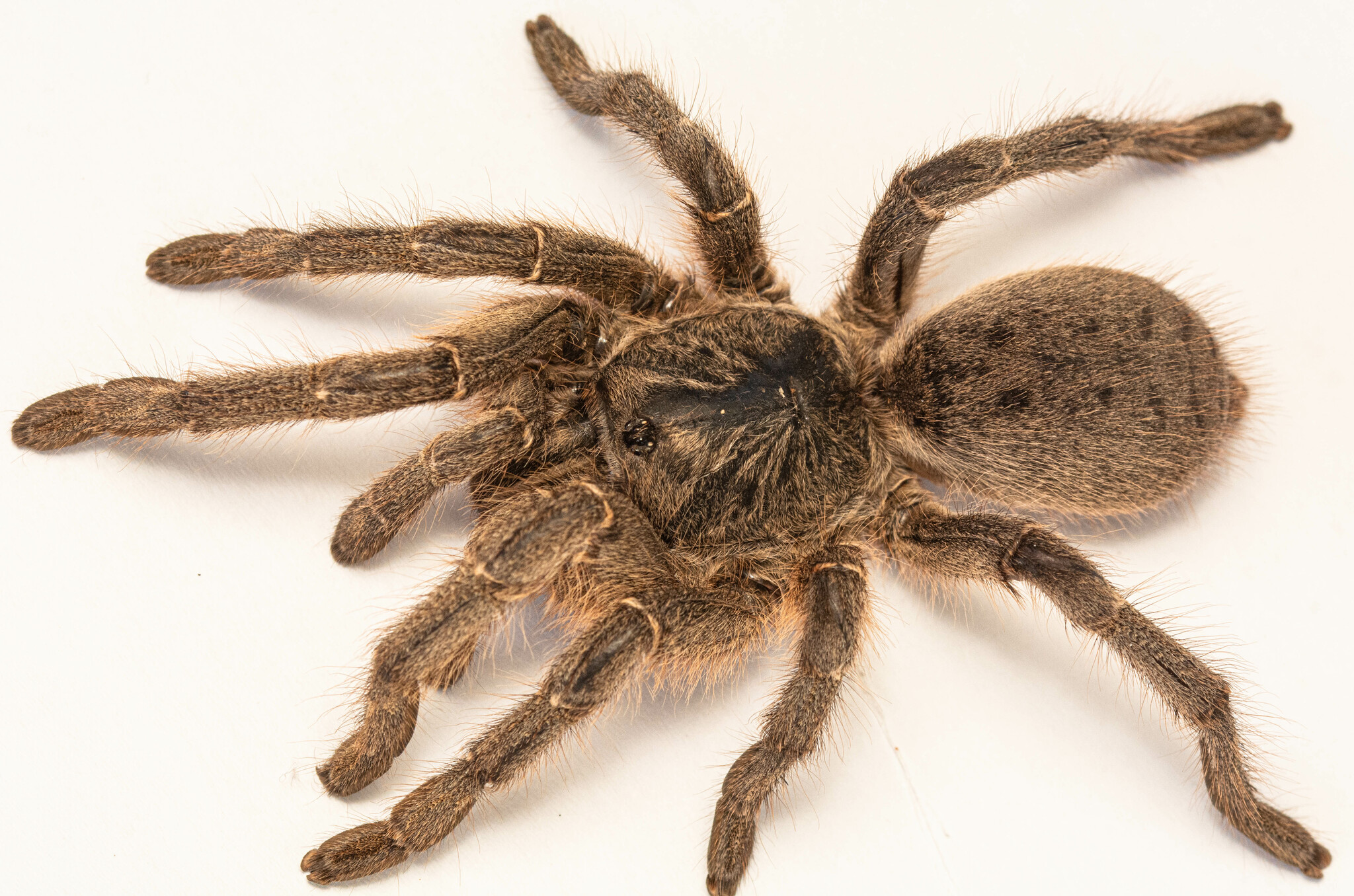

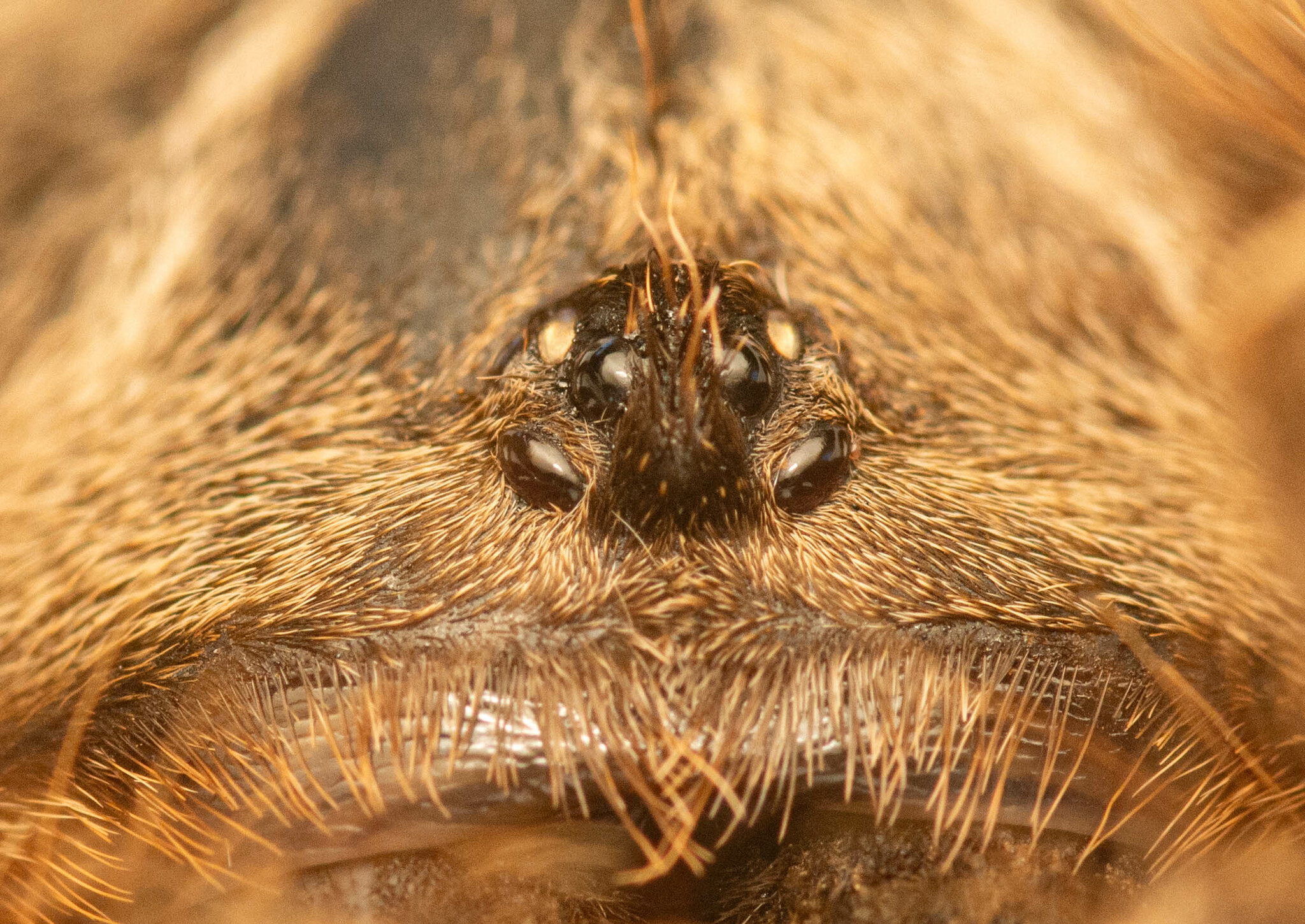

Scientific classification
- Kingdom: Animalia
- Phylum: Arthropoda
- Subphylum: Chelicerata
- Class: Arachnida
- Order: Araneae
- Infraorder: Mygalomorphae
- Family: Theraphosidae
- Genus: Harpactira
- Species: H. gigas

Binomial name
- Harpactira gigas Pocock, 1898

= Harpactira gigas =

Common baboon spider

Species of spider

Harpactira gigas, sometimes called the common baboon spider, is a species of spider belonging to the family Theraphosidae. It is found in South Africa from Western Cape Province north to Limpopo Province.

This reclusive spider, rarely encountered outside its burrow, reaches a body length of 55 mm, the female usually slightly larger than the male. The black carapace is marked with a distinctive pattern of radiating light brown lines, like the spokes of a wheel. Like all tarantulas, and almost all other spiders, this species is not considered dangerous to people.
