= Giant sea catfish =

Conservation status
- Data Deficient (IUCN 3.1)

Scientific classification
- Kingdom: Animalia
- Phylum: Chordata
- Class: Actinopterygii
- Order: Siluriformes
- Family: Ariidae
- Genus: Arius
- Species: A. gigas

Binomial name
- Arius gigas Boulenger, 1911

Synonyms
- Tachysurus gigas (Boulenger, 1911); Carlarius gigas (Boulenger, 1911)

Species of fish

The giant sea catfish (Arius gigas), also called the ewe or the marine catfish, is a species of sea catfish in the family Ariidae. It was described by George Albert Boulenger in 1911, originally under the genus Tachysurus. It is known from brackish and freshwater in the Burkina Faso, Ivory Coast, Cameroon, Benin, Mali, Ghana and Nigeria. It reaches a maximum total length of 165 cm (65 in), and a maximum weight of 50 kg (110 lb). Males incubate eggs in their mouths.

The giant sea catfish is of commercial significance as a food fish; however, its populations have declined due to over-fishing, and possibly chemical pollution.
