= Aplomya confinis =

Scientific classification
- Kingdom: Animalia
- Phylum: Arthropoda
- Clade: Pancrustacea
- Class: Insecta
- Order: Diptera
- Family: Tachinidae
- Subfamily: Exoristinae
- Tribe: Eryciini
- Genus: Aplomya
- Species: A. confinis

Binomial name
- Aplomya confinis (Fallén, 1820)

Synonyms
- Aplomya nitens Robineau-Desvoidy, 1830; Aplomya zonata Robineau-Desvoidy, 1830; Exorista aenescens Macquart, 1850; Exorista longicornis Macquart, 1850; Exorista longicornis Perris, 1852; Phryxe servillii Robineau-Desvoidy, 1830; Phryxe zonata Robineau-Desvoidy, 1830; Tachina bicingulata Zetterstedt, 1844; Tachina bizonata Zetterstedt, 1859; Tachina confinis Fallén, 1820

Species of fly

Aplomya confinis is a European species of fly in the family Tachinidae. It is a parasitoid of the Purple hairstreak.

== Distribution ==
British Isles, Czech Republic, Estonia, Hungary, Lithuania, Moldova, Poland, Romania, Slovakia, Ukraine, Denmark, Finland, Norway, Sweden, Albania, Andorra, Bosnia and Herzegovina, Bulgaria, Corsica, Croatia, Greece, Italy, Macedonia, Portugal, Serbia, Slovenia, Spain, Turkey, Austria, Belgium, France, Germany, Netherlands, Switzerland, Japan, South Korea, Iran, Israel, Mongolia, Canary Islands, Egypt, Russia, Russia, Azerbaijan, Malawi, Yemen, Uzbekistan, China.
