= Anopheles gigas =

Scientific classification
- Kingdom: Animalia
- Phylum: Arthropoda
- Class: Insecta
- Order: Diptera
- Family: Culicidae
- Genus: Anopheles
- Subgenus: Anopheles
- Species: A. gigas

Binomial name
- Anopheles gigas Giles, 1901

Species complex of mosquito

Anopheles gigas is a species complex of mosquito belonging to the genus Anopheles. It is endemic to Sri Lanka. Two subspecies recorded.

== Subspecies ==
- Anopheles gigas refutans
- Anopheles gigas simlensis
