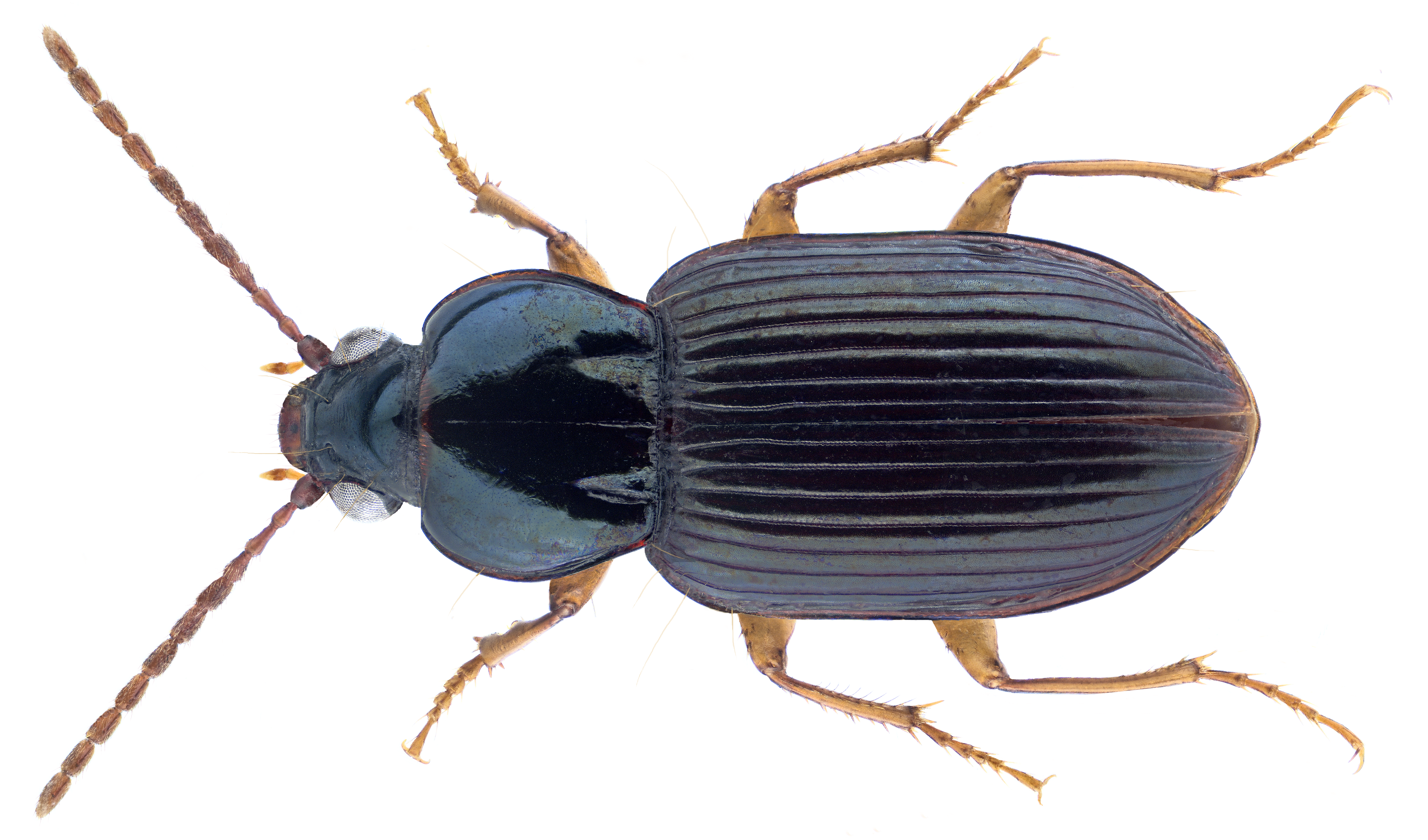
- Abacetus azurescens Straneo, 1955 Family: Carabidae Size: 5.8 mm Location: Senegal, M`Bour, environment Club Aldiana leg. U.Schmidt, 8.-20.X.1992; det. M.Baehr, 2018

Scientific classification
- Kingdom: Animalia
- Phylum: Arthropoda
- Class: Insecta
- Order: Coleoptera
- Suborder: Adephaga
- Family: Carabidae
- Genus: Abacetus
- Species: A. azurescens

Binomial name
- Abacetus azurescens Straneo, 1955

= Abacetus azurescens =

Species of beetle

Abacetus azurescens is a species of ground beetle in the subfamily Pterostichinae. It was described by Straneo in 1955 and is found across West Africa.
