= Aspergillus occultus =

Scientific classification
- Kingdom: Fungi
- Division: Ascomycota
- Class: Eurotiomycetes
- Order: Eurotiales
- Family: Aspergillaceae
- Genus: Aspergillus
- Species: A. occultus

Binomial name
- Aspergillus occultus C.M. Visagie, K.A. Seifert, J.C. Frisvad & R.A. Samson (2014)

Type strain
- CMV-2014d, CBS 137330, CBS H-21794, DTO 231-A7, IBT 32285

Species of fungus

Aspergillus occultus is a species of fungus in the genus Aspergillus. It is from the Circumdati section. The species was first described in 2014. It has been reported to produce ochratoxin A and penicillic acid.

== Growth and morphology ==
A. occultus has been cultivated on both Czapek yeast extract agar (CYA) plates and Malt Extract Agar Oxoid® (MEAOX) plates. The growth morphology of the colonies can be seen in the pictures below.

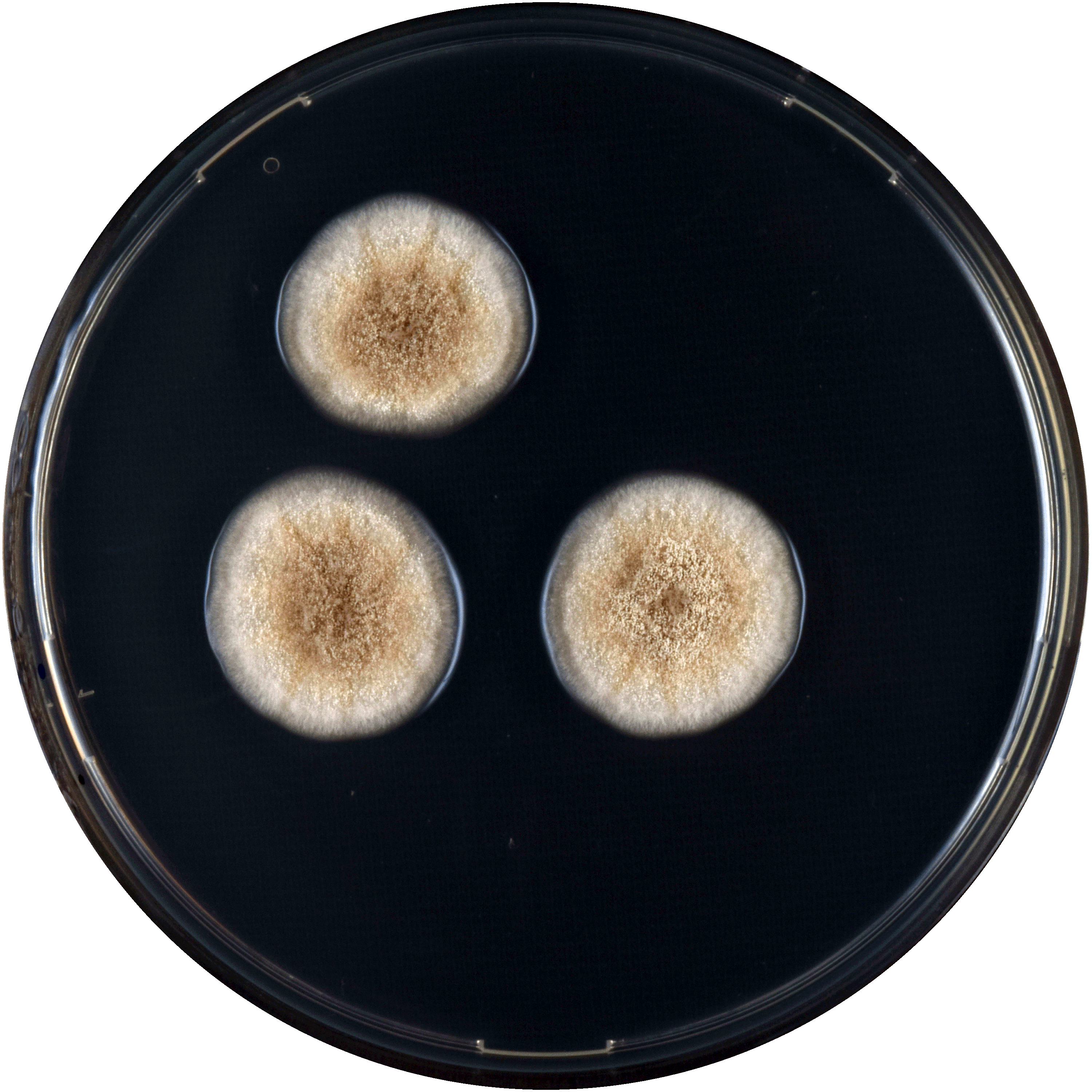
Aspergillus occultus growing on CYA plate

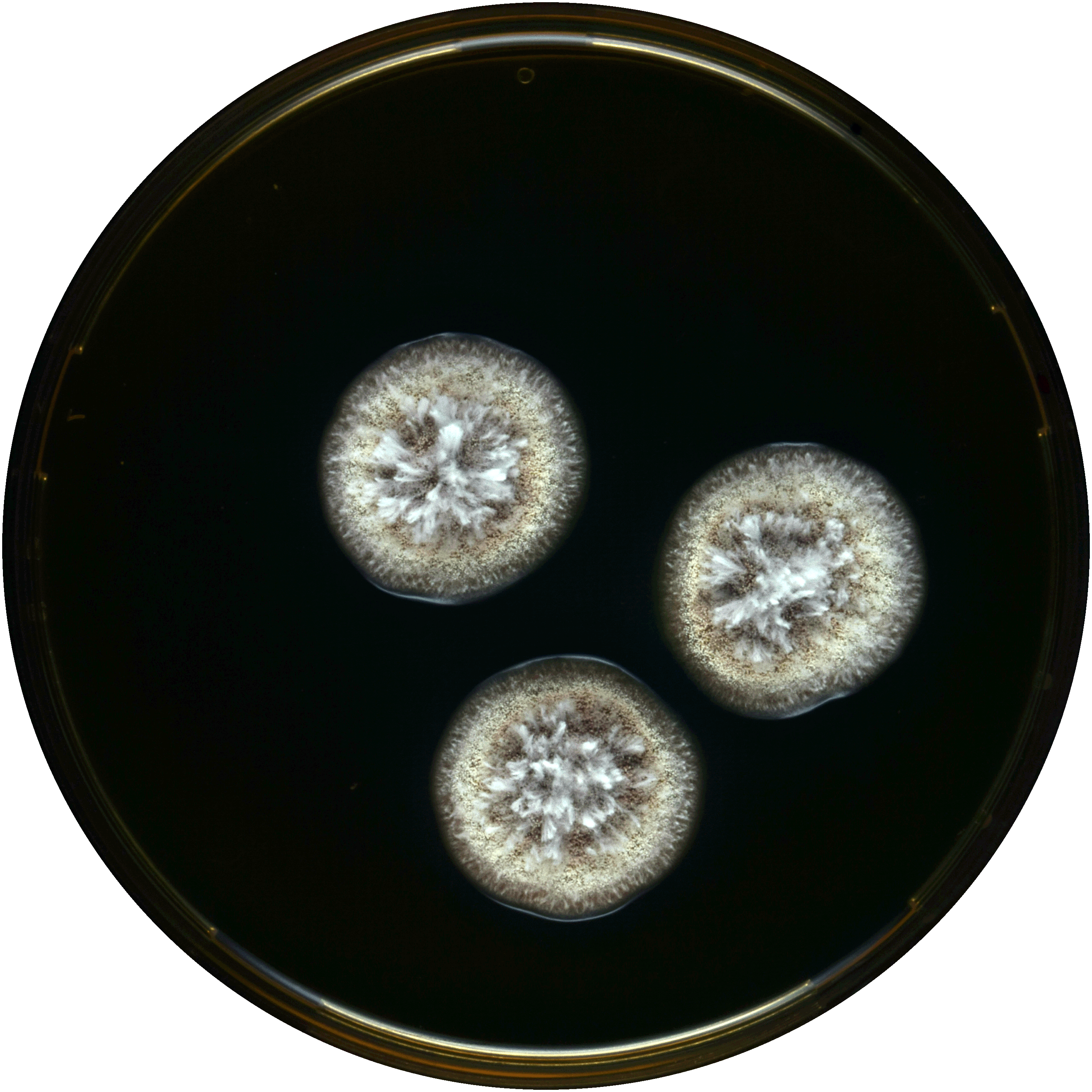
Aspergillus occultus growing on MEAOX plate
