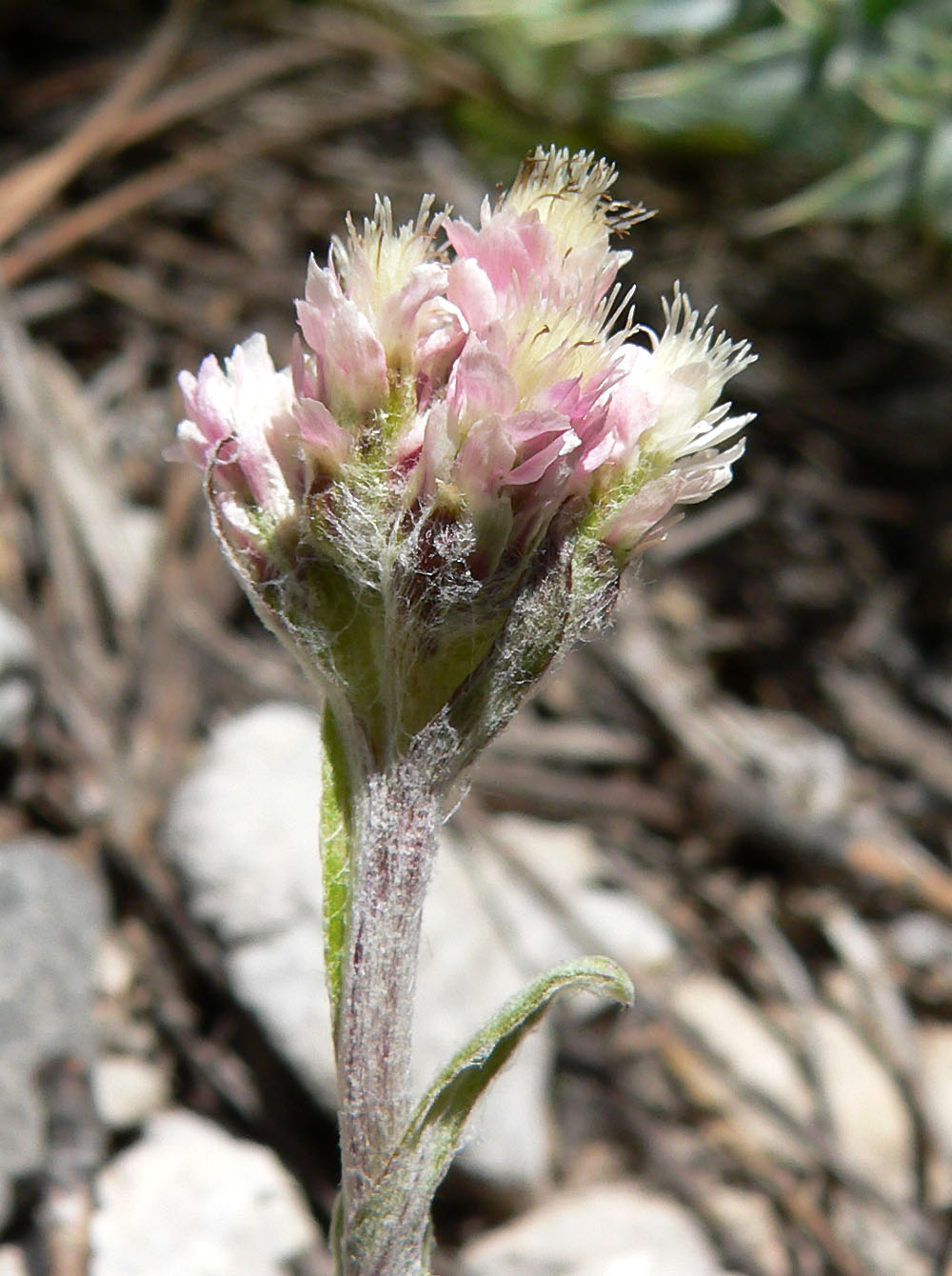

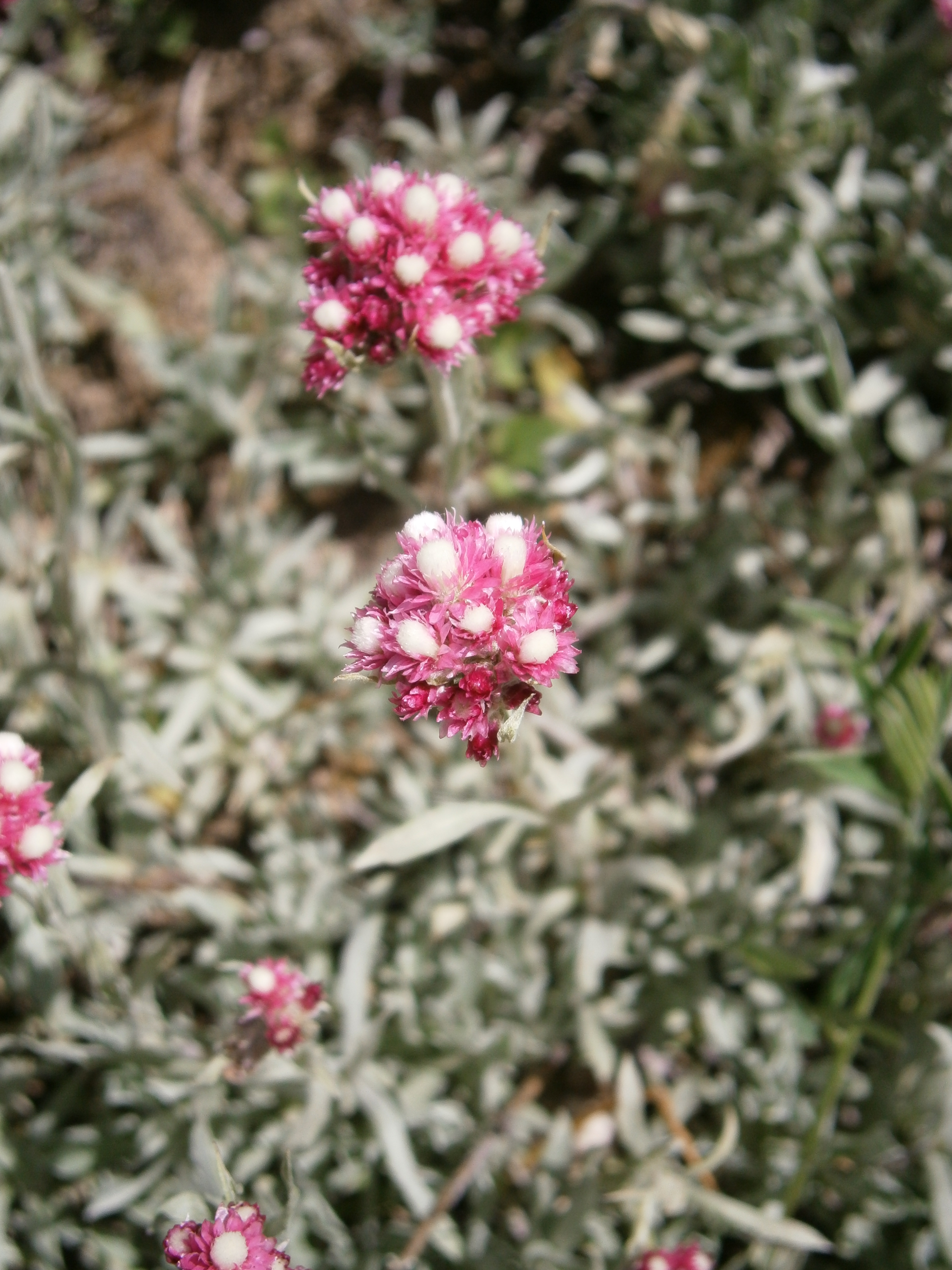

Conservation status
- Secure (NatureServe)

Scientific classification
- Kingdom: Plantae
- Clade: Tracheophytes
- Clade: Angiosperms
- Clade: Eudicots
- Clade: Asterids
- Order: Asterales
- Family: Asteraceae
- Genus: Antennaria
- Species: A. rosea

Binomial name
- Antennaria rosea Greene

Synonyms
- Synonymy: Antennaria acuminata Greene; Antennaria alborosea A.E.Porsild ex Porsild; Antennaria chlorantha Greene; Antennaria formosa Greene; Antennaria hendersonii Piper; Antennaria imbricata E.E.Nelson; Antennaria lanulosa Greene; Antennaria oxyphylla Greene; Antennaria speciosa E.Nelson; Antennaria arida E.E.Nelson, syn of subsp. arida; Antennaria scariosa E.E.Nelson, syn of subsp. arida; Antennaria viscidula (E.E.Nelson) A.Nelson ex Rydb., syn of subsp. arida; Antennaria albicans Fernald, syn of subsp. confinis; Antennaria angustifolia Rydb., syn of subsp. confinis; Antennaria breitungii A.E.Porsild, syn of subsp. confinis; Antennaria brevistyla Fernald, syn of subsp. confinis; Antennaria concinna E.E.Nelson, syn of subsp. confinis; Antennaria confinis Greene, syn of subsp. confinis; Antennaria elegans A.E.Porsild, syn of subsp. confinis; Antennaria incarnata A.E.Porsild, syn of subsp. confinis; Antennaria laingii A.E.Porsild, syn of subsp. confinis; Antennaria leontopodioides (Willd.) Cody 1957 not (Willd.) Nakai 1952, syn of subsp. confinis; Antennaria leuchippi Porsild, syn of subsp. confinis; Antennaria sedoides Greene, syn of subsp. confinis; Antennaria sordida Greene 1899 not Sch. Bip. 1854, syn of subsp. confinis; Antennaria steetziana Turcz., syn of subsp. confinis; Antennaria subviscosa Fernald, syn of subsp. confinis; Antennaria tomentella E.E.Nelson, syn of subsp. confinis; Filago leontopodioides Willd., syn of subsp. confinis; Gnaphalium leontopodioides (Willd.) Willd., syn of subsp. confinis; Leontopodium leontopodioides (Willd.) Beauverd, syn of subsp. confinis; Leontopodium sibiricum Cass., syn of subsp. confinis; Antennaria affinis Fernald, syn of subsp. pulvinata; Antennaria albescens (E.E.Nelson) Rydb., syn of subsp. pulvinata; Antennaria fusca E.E.Nelson, syn of subsp. pulvinata; Antennaria gaspensis (Fernald) Fernald, syn of subsp. pulvinata; Antennaria isolepis Greene, syn of subsp. pulvinata; Antennaria maculata Greene, syn of subsp. pulvinata; Antennaria manicouagana P.Landry, syn of subsp. pulvinata; Antennaria peasei Fernald, syn of subsp. pulvinata; Antennaria pulvinata Greene, syn of subsp. pulvinata; Antennaria sansonii Greene, syn of subsp. pulvinata; Antennaria straminea Fernald, syn of subsp. pulvinata

= Antennaria rosea =

Species of flowering plant

Antennaria rosea is a North American species of flowering plant in the family Asteraceae known by the common name rosy pussytoes. Other common names include cat's foot and mountain everlasting. The second part of its scientific name, rosea, is Latin for pink.

== Description ==
This herbaceous perennial grows to a height of 10 to 40 centimeters (4 to 15 1/2 in). It has a network of short stolons by which it spreads, its method of vegetative reproduction. It forms a basal patch of woolly grayish leaves 1 to 4 cm (1/2 to 1 1/2 in) long. Blooming early in summer, the inflorescence contains several flower heads in a cluster. Each head is lined with wide, pointed phyllaries which are often rose in color, the trait that gives the species its name, but they may also be white, yellowish, or brownish. The species is dioecious, but since most of the individuals are female, most bear flower heads containing pistillate flowers. The fruit is an achene with a body less than 2 millimeters long and a pappus which may be 6 or 7 mm long. The plant often produces fertile seeds, but most individuals in most populations are clones. Plants are sometimes fertilized with pollen from other Antennaria species, which may bring new genes into an A. rosea population, increasing the genetic diversity amongst the clones.

The species is polyploid and exhibits apomixis; most all the plants are female and they reproduce asexually.

== Distribution and habitat ==
Antennaria rosea is widespread across much of Canada including all three Arctic territories, as well as Greenland, the western and north-central United States, and the Mexican state of Baja California.

The plant occupies many habitats, from dry to wet climates and low elevation to very high. It is a very morphologically diverse species; individuals can look very different.

== Cultivation ==
In the UK, A. rosea has gained the Royal Horticultural Society's Award of Garden Merit.

Subspecies

- Antennaria rosea subsp. arida (E.E.Nelson) R.J.Bayer
- Antennaria rosea subsp. confinis (Greene) R.J.Bayer
- Antennaria rosea subsp. pulvinata (Greene) R.J.Bayer
- Antennaria rosea subsp. rosea
