= Dodero =

Dodero may refer to:

- Agostino Dodero (1864–1937), an Italian entomologist
- Louis Dodero (1824–1902), a French photographer credited for inventing the carte de visite
- John Dodero (1946), a potter working in Raku fired ceramics
- Compañía Argentina de Navegación Dodero, a constituent company of Empresa Líneas Marítimas Argentinas

== See also ==
- Dodro
- Dondero
