= Cyrtotyphlus =

Scientific classification
- Kingdom: Animalia
- Phylum: Arthropoda
- Class: Insecta
- Order: Coleoptera
- Suborder: Polyphaga
- Infraorder: Staphyliniformia
- Family: Staphylinidae
- Tribe: Entomoculiini
- Genus: Cyrtotyphlus; Dodero, 1900

Type species
- Cyrtotyphlus convexus Dodero, 1900

Species
- Cyrtotyphlus alfredoi; Cyrtotyphlus bohiniensis; Cyrtotyphlus bonadonai; Cyrtotyphlus convexus; Cyrtotyphlus euganeensis; Cyrtotyphlus kaiseri; Cyrtotyphlus meridio; Cyrtotyphlus thracicus; Cyrtotyphlus winkleri

Genus of beetles

Cyrtotyphlus is a genus of rove beetles in the subfamily Leptotyphlinae.

Names brought into synonymy

- Cyrtotyphlus apulus is a synonym for Neocyrtotyphlus apulus
