= Carte de visite =

Photographic visiting card

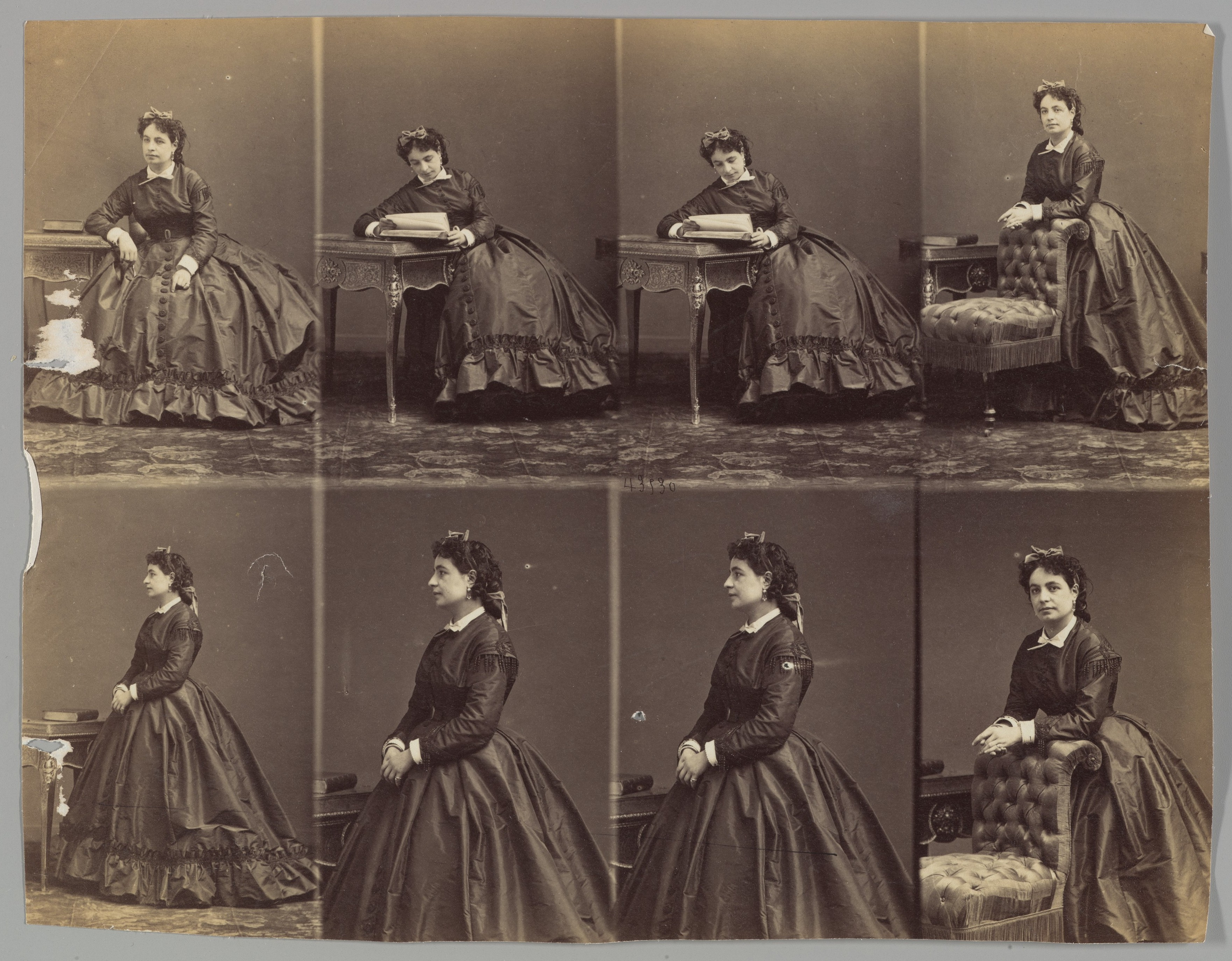
André-Adolphe-Eugène Disdéri (May–August 1863) Schneider. Uncut, unmounted carte-de-visite albumen silver print from glass negative 18.8 x 24.3 cm (7 3/8 × 9 9/16 in.). Gilman Collection, Gift of The Howard Gilman Foundation, Metropolitan Museum of Art

The carte de visite (French: [kaʁt də vizit], English: 'visiting card', abbr. 'CdV', pl. cartes de visite) was a format of small photograph which was patented in Paris by photographer André Adolphe Eugène Disdéri in 1854, although first used by Louis Dodero in 1851.

Each photograph was the size of a formal visiting card about 4½ x 2½ inches (11.4 x 6.3 cm) and such photograph cards, in what has been called an early form of social media, were commonly traded among friends and visitors in the 1860s. Albums for the collection and display of cards became a common fixture in Victorian parlors. The popularity of the format and its rapid uptake worldwide were due to their relative thrift, which made portrait photographs accessible to a broader demographic, and prior to the advent of mechanical reproduction of photographs, led to the publication and collection of portraits of prominent persons. It was the success of the carte de visite that led to photography's institutionalisation.

== Description ==
=== Format ===
The carte de visite was usually an albumen print from a collodion negative on thin paper glued onto a thicker paper card. The size of a carte de visite is 54 mm (2.125 in) × 89 mm (3.5 in) (approximately the size of a business card), mounted on a card sized 64 mm (2.5 in) × 100 mm (4 in). The reverse was generally printed with the logo of the photographer or the photography studio from which it came, as both protection of copyright and advertising, and sometimes carried instructions for effective posing.

=== Camera ===
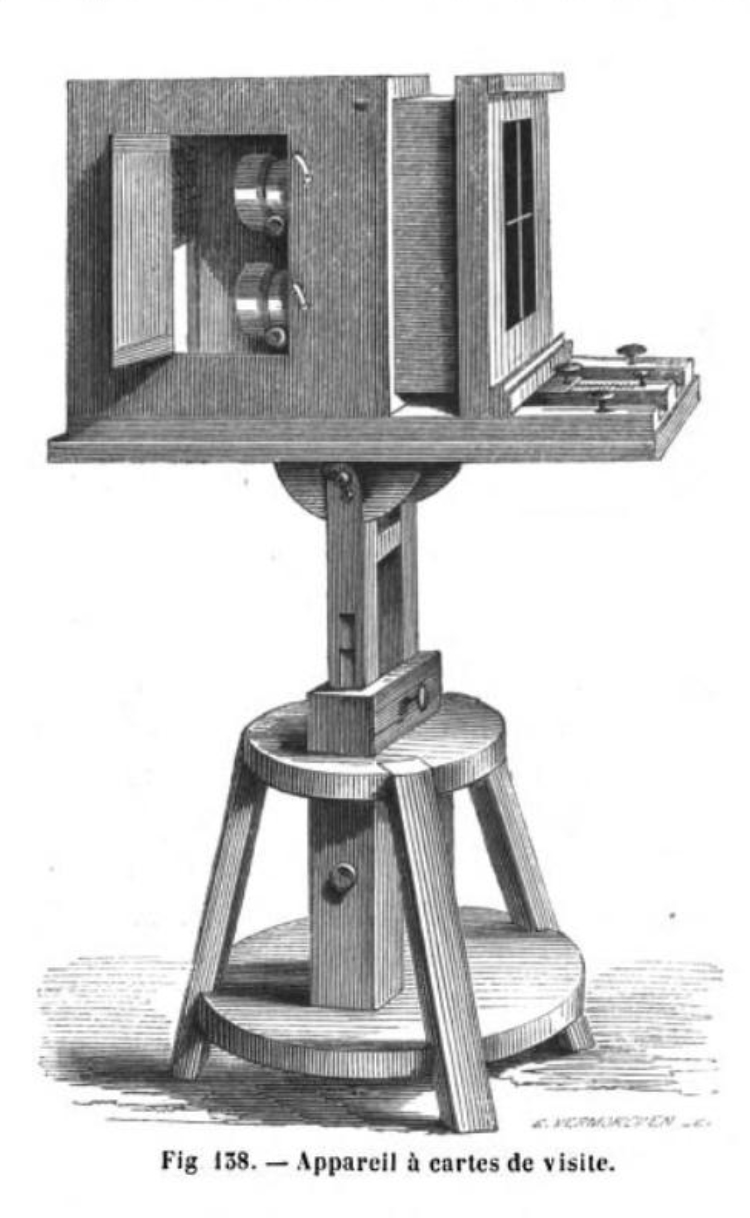
Cartes de visite camera with four lenses. Engraving from D. V. Monckhoven. Traité Général Photographie Comprenant tous les Procédés Connus jusqu'à ce Jour; La Théorie de la Photographie Application aux Sciences d’Observation. 1863

The daguerreotype for portrait photography had met with immediate and widespread popularity and quickly displaced the portrait miniature and its cheaper versions, the silhouette and the physionotrace. However its technologies were limited; a single copy made in the camera could be reproduced only by copying the original onto another plate. The carte-de-visite provided a wet collodion negative from which could be made multiple prints, in a standardised format, with cheaper materials, thus permitting production on an industrial scale. Consequently, it was even more affordable than the daguerreotype.

Special cameras were designed with multiple lenses for their efficient production. Disdéri's 1854 patent was a camera of taking eight separate negatives on a single plate in a special holder. Rather than one large collodion plate being used to produce one image of the posed subject, Disdéri's design initially exposed ten images on one plate, exposed either simultaneously or in sequence.

Each individual carte print was made at a fraction of the cost of producing one full-plate picture and ten were printed at once, saving time and thus efficiently serving the burgeoning consumer market for photography. Disdéri's patent was modified when making four images was found to be more practical, and in March 1860 optician Hyacinthe Hermagis patented a four-lens camera with a sliding back that became the standard. Désiré Monckhoven reported in 1859;

We saw at M. Hermagis' a magnificent device, consisting of 4 identical double lenses mounted on a double frame camera built by M. Besson. This device, in a single operation, provides a plate on which 8 copies of the same image appear with perfect clarity. It seems that in the big cities, such as Paris, London, Berlin, St. Petersburg, these cartes de visite are widely used, so the device we saw at M. Hermagis' enjoys considerable success.

=== Enlargements ===
Cartes de visite were made using a contact print—by placing the negative in contact with the albumen paper under glass and exposing the sandwiched materials to a light source. No enlarger was required.

Nevertheless, the development of the solar camera enabled enlargements of cartes up to life-size, often hand-coloured and retouched so that they rivalled the painted portrait, and could be framed and displayed. Prominent London photographer the French-born Antoine Claudet lectured on the technology to the British Association in Oxford in June 1860, and in 1862 presented "On the means of following the small divisions of the scale regulating the distances and enlargement in the solar camera" at the British Association for the Advancement of Science in October. Earlier that year he exhibited a number of life-size portrait enlargements from carte de visite negatives at the 1862 World Fair, which were praised as 'magnificent' and 'without distortion'.

== History ==
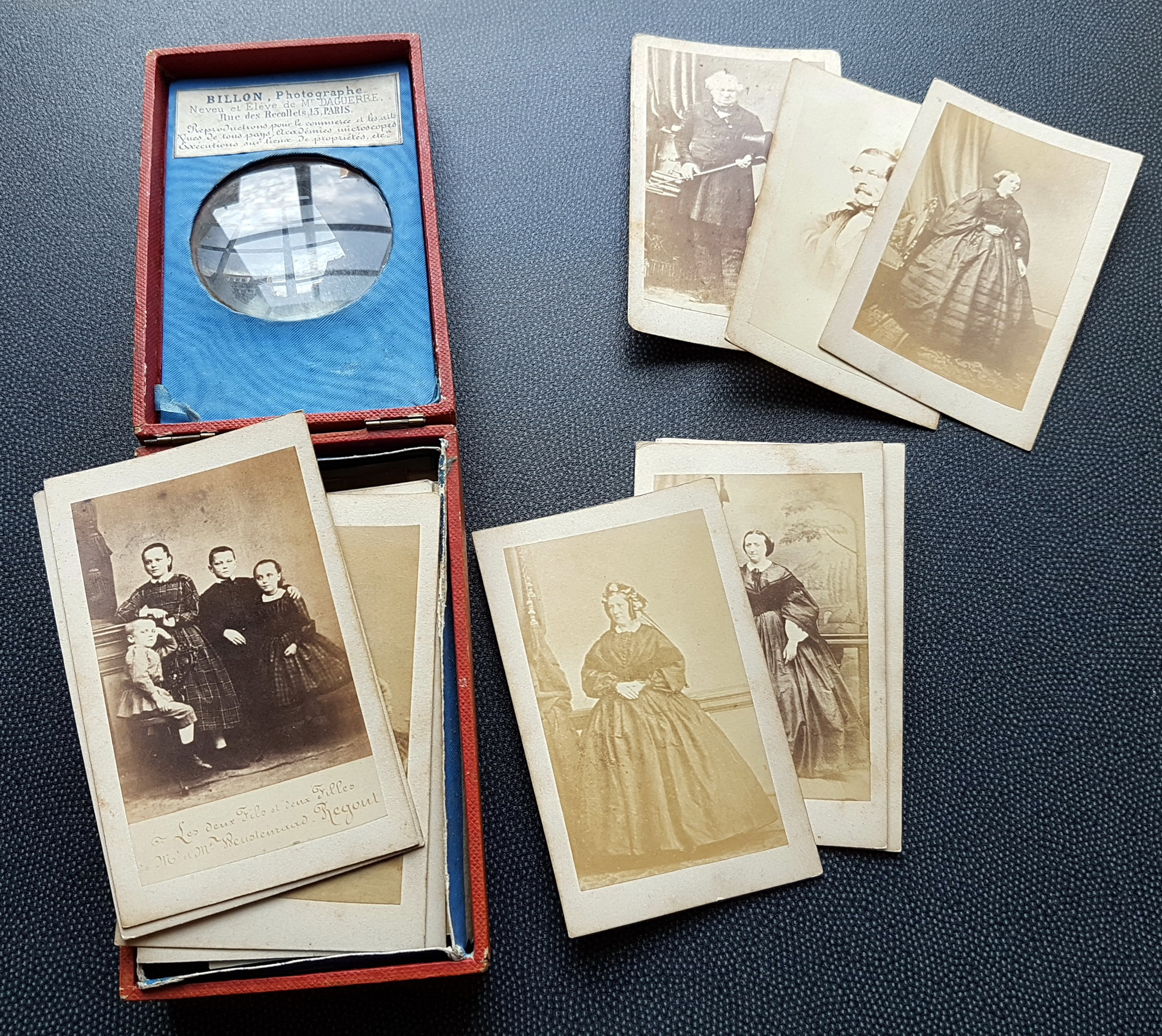
Box with cartes de visite of members of the Regout family, Netherlands, c. 1865

Cartes-de-visite were an adjunct to letter-writing; unlike the fragile daguerreotypes which preceded them and which also were used predominantly for portraits, they could be posted in regular manufactured envelopes which had become available only ten years before. Cartes-de-visite and now regarded as an early form of social media.

For example, as Belknap notes, Charles Darwin exchanged in his correspondence a large number; 132 photographic portraits before 1882. Their value to him was demonstrated in his response to their gift of an album by Dutch naturalists containing 217 carte de visites; "...for the few remaining years of my life, whenever I want cheering, I will look at the portraits of my distinguish co-workers in the field of science, and remember their generous sympathy. When I die the album will be the most precious bequest to my children."

However, as a Saturday Review, of 1862 notes; "The demand for photographs is not limited to relations or friends. […] Anyone who has seen you, or has seen anybody that has seen you, or knows anyone that says he has seen a person who thought he had seen you, considers himself entitled to ask you for your photograph."

John Ruskin considered a photograph of him taken by William Downey as ʻvisible libelʼ, while Punch illustrator John Tenniel discovered John Watkins selling a portrait of himself that he found unflattering and tried to prevent further sales. Women in particular found themselves vulnerable to having their pictures purchased by 'cads' who would boast that she had gifted them the image and, given the moral standards of the day, discovered their reputations 'tarnished'.

Photographers were in effect publishers, distributing thousands of copies of their images. They would pay a well-known sitter in return for the right to publish their photograph; "the person photographed was offered a flat fee ranging from 25 to 1000 dollars, depending upon notoriety, or a royalty based upon the number of copies sold". Those whose faces attracted sales, or who already had some incidental notoriety, earned further celebrity and might thus trade on it. However, copyright laws enacted contemporaneously in England protected photographers' rights over those of the subject. Andrew Wynter noted in 1862 that:

"The commercial value of the human face was never tested to such an extent as it is at the present moment in these handy photographs. No man, or woman either, knows but some accident may elevate them to the position of hero of the hour and send up the value their countenances to a degree they never dreamed of."

=== Demise ===
By the early 1870s, cartes de visite began to be supplanted by the cheaper tintypes franchised as the "American Gem," and by "cabinet cards" (the term established in Cabinet painting), which were also usually albumen prints, but larger, and mounted on cardboard backs measuring 110 mm (4.5 in) by 170 mm (6.5 in). Nevertheless, while larger framed prints became available at photography studios, the two smaller formats were the main trade of professional portrait photographers even between 1888, when George Eastman introduced the mass-produced and pre-loaded Kodak which industrialised the processing and printing of amateurs' photographs, and 1900, when the Brownie camera simplified the technology and so reduced the cost of the medium that snapshot photography became a mass phenomenon.

== Europe ==
=== Britain ===
In England John Jabez Edwin Mayall in Regent Street announced in August 1860 that he had;

...just received the Royal permission to publish a series of portraits which had been previously taken of the Royal family and of several other illustrious personages who have the honour of being intimate friends of her Majesty. These charming portraits are of miniature size; some of them are mounted on cards, and opposite to that of the Queen in the catalogue we find it described as a carte de visite. A complete series is placed upon a screen, in the centre of which are large portraits of his Royal Highness the Prince of Wales in military uniform, and his Royal Highness Prince Alfred in the dress of a midshipman in the Royal navy. Besides the single-figure portraits of the Royal family, there are several most delightful groups of them variously arranged [...] These portraits having been entirely divested of all appearance of Royal state, possess an air of novelty, and the illustrious personages being represented as if perfectly unconscious of the photographer's presence, and engaged in their ordinary occupations, seem to afford the public a legitimate peep into the privacy of the Royal apartments, and give a decided charm to this publication [...] purchasers may, while they have the satisfaction of displaying their loyalty, also have the pleasure of selecting those arrangements of the portraits to which they may give a preference. The whole series, including the personal friends of her Majesty, amounts to 32 portraits, and are very beautiful specimens of the photographic art.

Mayall's publication of a carte-de-visite album of the Royal Family influenced the growing demand from the Victorian public for their own family photographic albums.

=== France ===
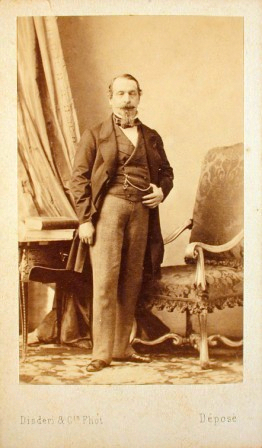
1859 carte de visite of Napoleon III by Disdéri, which popularized the carte-de-visite format

The carte de visite was slow to gain widespread use until 1859, when Disdéri published Emperor Napoleon III's photos in this format. This made the format an overnight success; as Disdéri was to boast; "Everyone knows how I suddenly became popular by inventing the carte de visite which I had patented in 1854." He charged 20 francs for twelve photographs when previously a single print would cost 50 to 100 francs, so that portraits were suddenly available at a cost that the lower middle classes could afford. The new invention was so popular that "cardomania" spread quickly throughout Europe and then to the rest of the world.

=== Jersey (Channel Islands) ===
Cartes de visite became popular in Jersey following the arrival of Henry Mullins, who established the island's first professional portrait studio at 7 Royal Square in 1848. After initially partnering with Milward, Mullins ran the Royal Saloon independently for over two decades, responding to the rising demand for cartes de visite inspired by trends in mainland Europe and Britain. He combined the conventions of painted miniature portraits with technological innovations that allowed for full-length images, incorporating props and drapery. Mullins’ studio attracted a broad clientele, from affluent locals and clergy to military officers and politicians, and he produced over 9,600 portraits.

The popularity of cartes de visite fostered a competitive studio environment in St Helier, with photographers such as A. Laurens, Julian B. Maguire, and others seeking to differentiate themselves through quality, innovation, and reputation. Some, like Marius, claimed ties to prominent French photographers such as Nadar, while J. B. Maguire emphasised technical and artistic advancement in his promotional materials.

=== Germany ===
In Germany, Emperor Wilhelm I encouraged this pictorial culture by investing approximately 120 studios with the imprimatur of Hofphotograph (court photographer), based on the cartes that each had made of the kaiser, flatteringly posed with his gloved right fist planted powerfully on a table bearing his plumed helmet, and of his family. Millions of his photographs were collected in German family albums.

=== Spain ===
The arrival of the carte de visite in Spain at the end of the 1850s radically transformed access to photographic portraits. In Madrid, the first studios to adopt this technique were the brothers Alonso Martínez and Jean Laurent, who around 1859 began offering these portraits after trips through Europe where they learned about the latest photographic innovations. The novelty coincided with technical advances such as albumen paper and wet collodion, which facilitated mass production of images.

The main Madrid photographic studios quickly established themselves as references for the new format. Alonso Martínez and brother set up their studio in the Puerta del Sol, standing out for their elaborate scenographies with columns, curtains and characteristic carpets. Jean Laurent, located in the Carrera de San Jerónimo since 1856, became the official photographer of Queen Isabella II in 1860, obtaining authorization to display the royal coat of arms on his cards. Eusebio Juliá, who opened his gallery in 1855, gained a reputation especially for his children's portraits. Pedro Martínez de Hebert, court miniaturist since 1851, stood out for his spectacular panorama murals that recreated luxurious gardens and salons, virtually transporting the subject to fantastic settings.

Initially, the formats lacked standardization, with cardstocks of variable weights and irregular dimensions. The first signatures on the back were simple stamps or handwritten inscriptions, but soon photographers understood their advertising value, creating elaborate lithographic designs that included addresses, medals obtained in exhibitions and royal coats of arms for those who enjoyed the privilege. The studios progressively incorporated painted backgrounds or panoramas that simulated elegant exteriors and interiors, abandoning the initial austere neutral backdrops. Specialties also emerged such as oval busts with blurred effects, hand-illuminated portraits with watercolor, and around 1867, the larger cabinet format introduced by Laurent.

The social and commercial aspect of the cartes de visite generated an unprecedented cultural phenomenon. The prices, initially high, progressively decreased due to competition among the more than seventy studios operating in Madrid around 1865, democratizing access to portraits. The cards were collected in family albums that were displayed at social gatherings, exchanged among relatives and friends as precious gifts. Photographers created commercial catalogs with portraits of the royal family, politicians, bullfighters, dramatic artists and personalities, which any citizen could acquire. The Casa Real strategically used this format as a propaganda tool, commissioning thousands of portraits of Isabella II that were distributed massively, turning the monarchical image into an everyday object present in numerous Spanish homes.

The Glorious Revolution of 1868 marked a turning point for photographers linked to the Crown. The dethronement of Isabella II forced studios like Laurent and Martínez de Hebert to hastily remove any reference to the royal house from their cards, scraping texts or covering coats of arms and compromising mentions with labels. This episode evidences the political dimension that the cartes de visite had acquired. The format continued to evolve in the following decades, with the appearance of new variants such as tintypes and alternative formats, although its use began to gradually decline from the 1880s. However, its impact was lasting: for the first time in history, broad layers of Spanish society could possess and preserve their own and others' images, democratizing visual memory and profoundly transforming cultural practices related to identity, remembrance and social representation.

== Asia ==
=== China ===
While numbers of European photographers visited and practiced in the country, Lai Afong (Chinese: 黎芳) was a successful Chinese-born photographer who, after working at the studio of Portuguese photographer José Joaquim Alves de Silveira between 1865 and 1867, established Afong Studio in Hong Kong in the late Qing Dynasty from c.1870, and was photographer to Governor of Hong Kong Sir Arthur Kennedy KCB and Grand Duke Alexei Alexandrovich of Russia. Other Chinese photo studios producing cartes de visite in the 1890s include those of Kung Tai (公泰照相樓) and Sze Yuen Ming (上洋耀華照相) in Shanghai, and Pun Lun (繽綸) in Hong Kong.

=== India ===
By the late 1850s the carte-de-visite had been taken up in India, particularly among the wealthy of Bombay. Hurrychind Chintamon was a successful early Indian photographers who made carte-de visite portraits of literary, political, and business figures, the most famous of which was of the Maharaja of Baroda, thousands of which were circulated.

== Africa ==
Frederick York of Cape Town received the first carte-de-visite camera in South Africa as a present from H.R.H. Prince Alfred in February 1861. In 19th-century West Africa, African-born photographers such as John Parkes Decker, Francis W. Joaque and the Lutterodt photographers produced cartes de visite for their upper-class African and expatriate customers.

== North America ==
=== Dominican Republic ===
The painter Epifanio Billini was considered the first photographer on the island. David Benjamín Benzo also stood out and later moved to Caracas, extending regional photographic networks. Toward the end of the 19th century, Abelardo Rodríguez Urdaneta contributed significantly to the development of Dominican photography, establishing practices, such as cartes de visite, that endured into the new century.

=== Honduras ===
Itinerant photographers such as Alva Pearsall (active in 1865), J. W. Newland and the German Juan Federico Lessman developed their work, all based in Venezuela. In 1883, Alfred P. Maudslay documented the ruins of Copán, leaving a valuable record of pre-Hispanic architecture. At the end of the century, Juan T. Aguirre worked in Tegucigalpa taking commercial views and later dedicated himself to photomechanical reproductions and the carte de visite.

=== Jamaica ===
Established in Kensington around 1878, Ernesto Bavastro made carte de visite portraits of prominent Cuban patriots, such as Máximo Gómez, Rafael Rodríguez, Enrique Collazo and Enrique Canals, exiled after the Ten Years' War. His studio, located at 67 King Street, Kingston, became a meeting center for the community of Cuban political exiles. Studios such as A. Duperly & Sons, George W. Davis and P. Sarthou produced large quantities of stereoscopic views between 1860 and 1870, taking advantage of the tourist boom and European and North American interest in exotic images of the island.

=== Mexico ===
The carte de visite became popular in Mexico after the end of the Reform War, allowing Mexicans to portray themselves in this format and create collections in albums. The affordable price enabled broad sectors to access their own images, family or admired characters for the first time, generating a fever for tarjetomanía. Figures like Emperors Maximilian and Carlota used these cards as a means of political propaganda, while images of national and foreign politicians were widely commercialized.

Outstanding studios drove its evolution, such as Cruces y Campa, inaugurated in 1862 in Mexico City, which distinguished itself for the quality of its cards and obtained recognitions in international exhibitions, such as Philadelphia in 1876. This firm produced series of Mexican types and a gallery of rulers. For its part, Valleto y Compañía, established in 1865, specialized in elite portraits, including the imperial court and republicans like Benito Juárez and Porfirio Díaz, and won prizes in exhibitions in Paris in 1876 and 1889, as well as in St. Louis, Missouri, in 1904.

These cards evolved as cultural artifacts that fused personal and collective memory, with uses in journalism, advertising and collecting. Their theatrical aesthetic, with elegant backgrounds and studied poses, reflected the influence of André Adolphe Disdéri, and their artisanal production combined physics and chemistry.

=== United States ===
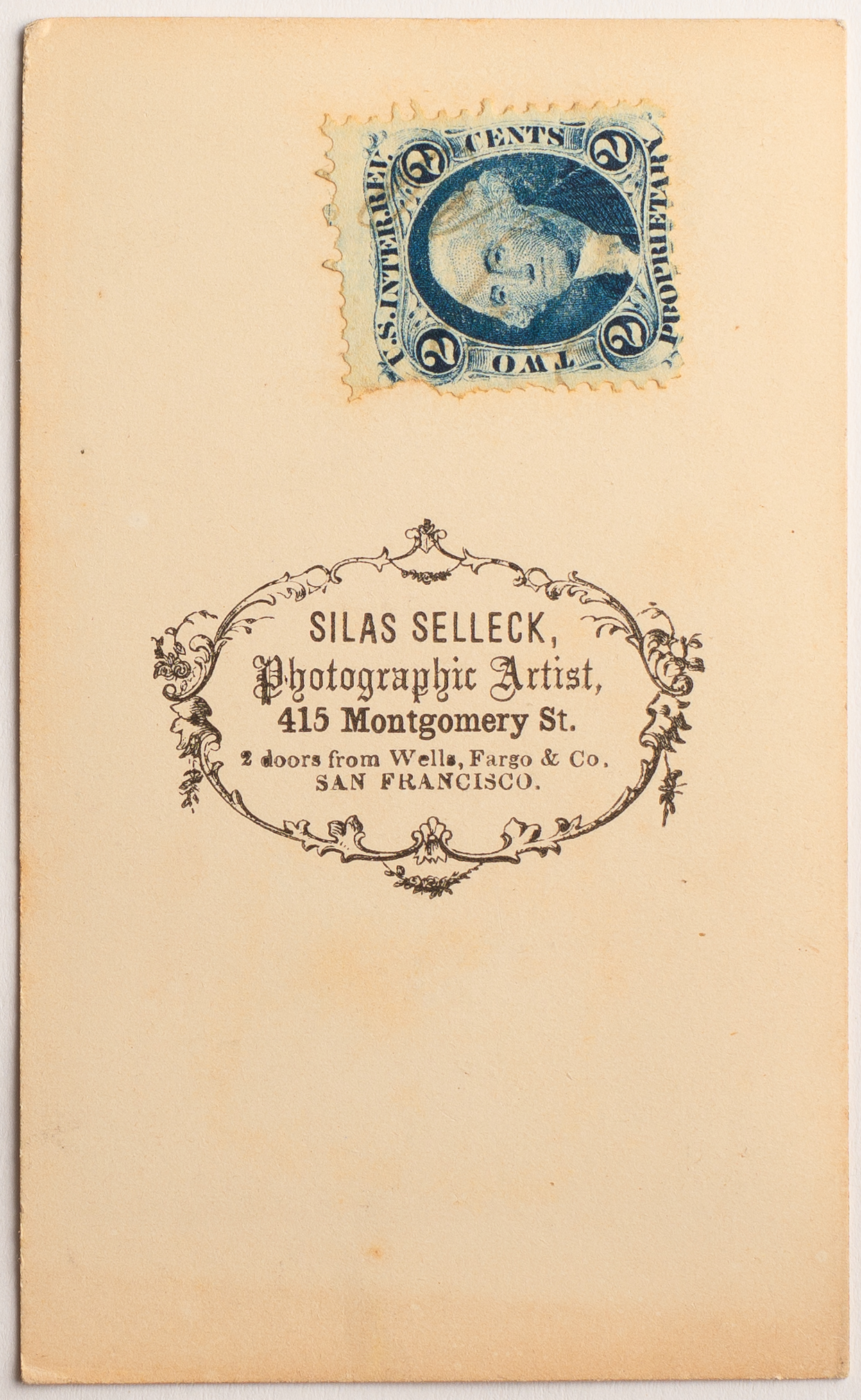
Back of a carte de visite (Silas Selleck, San Francisco). Based on the address and the revenue stamp, photo historians can determine the date of the card.

The carte de visite arrived in the United States in the summer of 1859, introduced in New York City by the photographer Charles DeForest Fredricks. Its arrival coincided with a period of rapid innovation in photography: the decline of the daguerreotype and the widespread adoption of negative-positive processes, which transformed portrait practice into a reproducible industry.

During the American Civil War (1861–1865), its production reached massive proportions. The format transformed into what Oliver Wendell Holmes Sr. described as a "social currency": it is estimated that between 300 and 400 million copies circulated annually in the 1860s. The cartes de visite filled domestic albums in which family portraits were mixed with those of political leaders, actors, writers and military personnel, reflecting a new visual culture based on collecting, fame and the circulation of personal images, comparable to the symbolic exchange that would later characterize digital social networks.

In the military field, the cartes de visite acquired strong sentimental and propagandistic value. Soldiers and officers commissioned portraits in uniform before departing for the front, presenting themselves with heroic dignity that contrasted with the harshness of the conflict. In many cases, these small photographs were sent to their families as proof of life or as a posthumous memento.

Among the main American photographers who cultivated this format are Mathew Brady, whose network of studios in New York and Washington D.C. produced portraits of first-order political and military figures, and Alexander Gardner, famous both for his battlefield views and his studio portraits. Other relevant authors were Charles D. Fredricks and Jeremiah Gurney, pioneers in the mass commercialization of photographic portraits.

Among the most widely disseminated portrayed are generals from both sides: George B. McClellan, Winfield Scott and John C. Frémont for the Union, as well as Robert E. Lee and P. G. T. Beauregard for the Confederacy. These images circulated widely as objects of public and private devotion, consolidating the carte de visite as one of the first visual mass media in American history.

== South America ==
=== Argentina ===
The carte de visite arrived in the Río de la Plata in 1855, introduced by the French photographer Federico Artigue, who advertised it in the Buenos Aires newspaper El Nacional offering five portraits at an affordable price of 100 pesos, which facilitated its commercial expansion. In that context, Argentina was in a process of post-independence modernization during the second half of the 19th century, marked by the consolidation of urban societies in Buenos Aires and other cities, with an emerging bourgeoisie driven by European immigration, economic growth and the formation of a small middle class seeking social self-determination and political recognition. This photographic technique emerged in a period of cultural transformation, where the current digitization of visual archives reveals tensions between the democratization of access to visual representation and the homogenization imposed by the consumer market, reflecting unconscious desires for social legitimation in a forming society, influenced by forced migrations, nationalisms and global flows of information. Between 1865 and 1870, in the framework of the Paraguayan War, the press suggests that the cartes de visite constituted the only photographic method practiced in Buenos Aires. Photographers competed intensely to portray soldiers departing for the front, who could acquire several cartes de visite at a much lower price than a daguerreotype and send them to family and friends. This situation significantly favored the expansion of photographic portraits in society.

This format had a significant impact by massifying photographic portraits, turning them into objects of social circulation, exchange and collection in albums, which memorialized bourgeois rituals such as weddings, baptisms and deaths, and emphasized the theatricality of standardized poses to project refinement and class belonging, although it subsumed individuality in a uniformity that diluted racial and social differences. It acted as a repository of the Benjaminian "optical unconscious," revealing modern apprehensions and resistances to the norm. Its major exponents were Alexander S. Witcomb, whose studio in Buenos Aires from the 1880s produced a vast collection of family and promotional portraits; Federico Artigue, as the initial introducer; Florencio Bixio, of Italian origin, who operated between 1900 and 1930 the studios Bixio y Merlino and Bixio y Castiglioni, and José Caffaro, both specialized in studio portraits, weddings and personalities from the social and artistic spheres.

=== Bolivia ===
The carte de visite arrived in Bolivia probably during the 1860s, following the European fashion that had already reached Lima in 1859 with the French photographer Félix Carbillet. Produced in multiple copies, these photographs were sent to family, friends or acquaintances, and by the second half of the 1860s their use had become widespread, especially among the urban elite, who not only sent their portraits but also collected them. The circulation of cartes de visite reached both cities and villages and even haciendas, using formal mail services and local delivery customs, such as transport by chaqui cachas, and specific rates were recorded for this type of shipment according to weight and the nature of the document. The social impact of the carte de visite in Bolivia was considerable, as it expanded access to photographic portraits previously restricted to painting and economically affluent sectors. Not only the elite but also popular sectors, such as cholos, cholas and mestizos, could be portrayed, showing their clothing, adornments, hairstyles and attitudes, as well as the settings and decorations that reflected their social imaginaries. The growing demand generated the appearance of numerous portrait photographers, including Luís Lavadenz Richardson, Natalio Bernal, Auguste Sterlin and Modestino García, who imprinted their own view on Bolivian society. The cartes de visite, both in their images and associated texts, thus became valuable historical documents that allow studying social relations, power structures, identities and collective imaginaries of 19th-century Bolivia.

Bolivian photographers such as Ricardo Villalba, active between 1860 and 1870 in La Paz, Arequipa and Lima, produced outstanding works in this format, portraying various ethnic groups of the southern Andes and establishing themselves as references in photography in the country.

=== Brazil ===
The carte de visite arrived in Brazil during the 1850s, at a time when photographic practice was expanding after the daguerreotype period (1840–1858). The introduction of the negative-positive process allowed costs to be reduced and photographic portraits to be democratized, making them accessible to a wider clientele. This technical change coincided with the economic growth of 1860—characterized by railway expansion, European immigration and the consolidation of an urban middle class—which boosted the opening of photographic studios in Rio de Janeiro, São Paulo and other cities. In that context, the carte de visite became a social fashion among the affluent sectors seeking to portray themselves and share their image in a small format, following the European model. The format was consolidated thanks to the patronage of Emperor Pedro II, a great promoter of photography, who granted the title of Photographo da Casa Imperial to renowned professionals such as Buvelot & Prat, Joaquim Insley Pacheco, Stahl & Wahnschaffe, José Ferreira Guimarães and Henschel & Benque. These workshops, many run by European immigrants, served both the court and the new middle sectors aspiring to social prestige. The dissemination of the carte de visite in Brazil thus reflected the country's modernization process and the creation of a visual culture associated with imperial progress. Its peak began to decline in the 1870s, when it was replaced by the cabinet format.

=== Chile ===
The carte de visite arrived in Chile through Francisco Rosales, who brought his portrait in this format from Europe. This fact motivated Santiago photographers to produce portraits "equal to those of Paris," quickly displacing the popularity of the daguerreotype. The portraits of approximately 7x5 cm mounted on rigid cardstocks became the new photographic standard in the country, printed with the name and address of the photographic studio. Photography in carte de visite format spread rapidly among the Chilean bourgeoisie and affluent classes, but soon became accessible to the middle sectors, becoming an instrument of communication and social cohesion. For Chilean society, these cards represented the expression of the personality's effort to affirm itself, where the well-staged portrait testified to success and manifested social position, allowing the Chilean bourgeois to create a new lineage inaugurated by his personal prestige. The format boosted the birth of photographic albums in Chile, where families collected portraits of relatives and friends creating authentic photographic family trees that functioned as a unifying pole for the family clan. In addition, the incorporation of portraits of Chilean politics and entertainment figures—available in specialized stores—set a precedent for the cult of public personality in the country.

=== Colombia ===
The carte de visite arrived in Colombia at the beginning of the 1860s, coinciding with a period of political and economic transformation after the collapse of the Granadine Confederation in 1861. In that context, General Tomás Cipriano de Mosquera assumed as provisional president and promoted key reforms, such as the disamortization of ecclesiastical goods, which transferred religious properties to the State and activated inert economic resources, mainly benefiting liberal merchants. At the same time, the Rionegro Convention of 1863 promulgated a federalist Constitution that lasted until 1876, with emphasis on individual freedoms—of worship, press and trade—and state autonomy, which facilitated the importation of photographic equipment after the elimination of protectionist tariffs in the mid-century. This framework fostered the boom of photography, driven by the wet collodion process and the availability of industrial materials of English, French or American origin. The impact of the carte de visite format was profound, popularizing photography and turning it into a massive phenomenon accessible beyond the elites. It generated a bonanza that multiplied photographic studios in the country—from a handful initially to more than a hundred—and stimulated mass production, with estimates of more than a million copies sold until 1886 in a nation of less than four million inhabitants. The format lasted until the mid-1880s, with extensions until the beginning of the 20th century, and expanded the dissemination of images of political, ecclesiastical, military leaders and celebrities, in addition to fostering genres such as costumbrismo and exterior views, precursors of postcards.

Among its major representatives were Demetrio Paredes and Julio Racines in Bogotá, who charged premium prices for their technical quality and sobriety, with Paredes standing out for his handling of lights and settings, and Racines for additional portraits in other formats. Other pioneers included Luis García Hevia, Manuel María Paz, José Gregorio Gutiérrez Ponce—with ironic touches in popular characters—, Wilis y Restrepo, Gabriel Román Polanco in Cartagena, and Pastor Restrepo in Medellín, who innovated with photographs of plants and orchids. In remote regions, figures like Antonio Martínez de la Cuadra, Gonzalo Gaviria, Ezequiel de la Hoz and Vicente Pacini contributed to its expansion, while innovators like Juan Martínez Lión experimented with double exposures, marking creative advances in the medium.

The prices of the cartes de visite varied: a dozen portraits by Julio Racines cost six pesos, by Rafael Villaveces five pesos with eighty cents, and by Wills y Restrepo no more than five pesos.

=== Ecuador ===
In Ecuador, the carte de visite was consolidated as an essential medium for social and political representation at the end of the 19th century and beginning of the 20th century. Benjamín Rivadeneira in Quito was a pioneer in the production of this format from 1880, capturing both the local elite and everyday scenes and documenting historical events such as Ecuador's participation in the Chicago World's Fair in 1893. At the end of the 19th century, José Domingo Laso (1870–1927) established himself in Quito, opening the Fotografía Laso workshop in 1899, becoming practically the official photographer of the city, offering the realization of classic cartes de visite and portraits of the elite, religious and political authorities. Laso promoted in 1909 the edition of La Ilustración Ecuatoriana, one of the first magazines in Ecuador to accompany its articles with photographs, contributing to the development of a national visual identity. As a printer, he was one of the initiators of the illustrated postcard business in Ecuador, publishing between 1899 and 1927 many cards with landscapes and views of Quito, including series called "Alrededores de Quito y Costumbres de Indios". Between 1860 and 1870, the French-American photographer Camillus Farrand traveled through Ecuador, Colombia, Peru and Venezuela carrying his "magic lamp," a novel invention to create stereoscopic photographs in third dimension in cities such as Quito, Ibarra and Riobamba.

=== Peru ===
In 1860, Eugene Maunoury, correspondent of Nadar, opened an elegant studio in Lima that popularized the carte de visite. Years later, his employee Eugene Courret and his brother bought the business, turning the studio into the most important in the history of Peruvian photography until its closure in 1935. The Courrets documented the Chincha Islands War in 1866 against Spain, the War of the Pacific with Chile and portrayed the most important personalities of their time, leaving an archive of 55,000 negative glass plates that the National Library of Peru acquired in the 1980s, constituting the most important graphic testimony of Peruvian events between the mid-19th century and the first three decades of the 20th century.

The American Villroy Richardson, who had arrived called by the daguerreotypist Benjamin Franklin Pease, became independent and constituted one of the most prestigious studios whose best years coincided with the carte de visite fever, standing out for the quality of his illuminations in portraits such as those of Carolina de Gutiérrez and Margarita Carmelino in 1864. For his part, Eugenio Courrier arrived in Lima in 1861 from Paris, trained with Nadar, and in 1863 opened his own establishment with his brother Achille, producing from cartes de visite with the portraits of the heroes of the failed American Congress of 1864 to images of the Spanish ship "Villa de Madrid" in 1866, the year of its participation in the Battle of Callao.

The Lima studios documented both public figures and historical episodes through the carte de visite format. José Gálvez Egusquiza, national hero descendant of the Gálvez family of Macharaviaya and minister of war, was portrayed in 1866, the year he died in the Battle of Callao. Photographers also made portraits of typical city characters, such as the famous tapadas and Peruvian types, in images that combined ethnographic value with portrait quality, documenting local clothing and customs in collectible formats that circulated widely.

The carte de visite format also allowed documenting Lima's urban life, from the construction of the Central Market or Mercado de La Concepción in the 1860s, to bullfighting events in the Plaza Firme de Toros de Hacho. Photographic studios displayed their cartes de visite in reception rooms as catalogs, flaunted on the back of the cardstocks their awards in national exhibitions, and commercialized both private portraits and images of documentary interest, consolidating Lima as one of the main photographic centers of South America in the 19th century.

=== Uruguay ===
The carte de visite arrived quickly in Uruguay after its launch in 1854. From the early years of the 1860s, Uruguayan photographic studios and bookstores sold various classes of albums, from simple to sophisticated "leather and tortoiseshell," with "ivory covers, mother-of-pearl or rosewood inlays," which were very expensive luxury pieces. The dissemination of the format made photography cheaper and expanded it to new audiences, fostering collecting, and albums were generally assembled by the women of the family. Celebrity albums also circulated with images of rulers, public men and art characters, which were exchanged among friends and family.

The Uruguayan photographic studios that competed for clientele during the last third of the 19th century promoted novel portrait systems, some reproducing global trends and others consisting of local initiatives that took advantage of the appearance and style of public figures. One of the most widespread uses was to give portraits as a token of friendship or love, with bust shots on neutral backgrounds predominating. In the 1890s decade, portraits outside the studio of large groups multiplied, reflecting social changes associated with affinity ties and representing both family bonds and fraternal relationships of individuals sharing political, labor and philanthropic associations.

The carte de visite format also served as a support for the figure of the martyr and the war record in Uruguay. In June 1866, the Bate y Ca. photographic studio sent a correspondent to Paraguay to photograph the War of the Triple Alliance, producing collections to sell to the Montevidean public with government support. After the siege of Paysandú in January 1865, mosaics of portraits of executed military chiefs collected by adherents to their Political faction were sold. After the civil wars of 1897 and 1904, photographs commemorated military victories and "institutional peace," circulating postcards with portraits of figures such as President José Batlle y Ordóñez and General Pablo Galarza, as well as images alluding to the death of the white caudillo Aparicio Saravia.

=== Venezuela ===
The carte de visite arrived in Venezuela in 1862, introduced by the photographer Próspero Rey after a trip to France, where he was portrayed by Adolphe Disdéri. At that time, the country was in the initial phase of republican consolidation post-independence, after the wars of independence (1810–1823) that decimated the population and destroyed the colonial economic structure, leaving a panorama of ruin and social transformation. Under governments like that of José Antonio Páez (1830–1846), Venezuela was a predominantly a pardo or mestizo society, known as "café con leche," (coffee with milk) with racial tensions inherited from the caste regime, where free non-white sectors pressed for social and economic recognition. By mid-19th century, Caracas had approximately 45,000 inhabitants, of which 13,000 were slaves, representing 58% of the labor force; the colored population (blacks, mulattos, zambos and pardos) constituted 85%, while whites were a minority in a precarious situation. The abolition of slavery in 1854 and conflicts like the Federal War (1859–1863) accentuated instabilities, with peasant rebellions and anxieties over ethno-class distinctions in a context of emerging commercial and military bourgeoisie, driven by coffee exports. In this context, the carte de visite had a significant impact by making photographic portraits much more accessible, allowing urban middle layers, mostly non-white, to legitimize their social position through representations that simulated European modernity, symbolic whitening and distinction from rural or "barbaric" customs. It acted as a device for individuation and self-promotion, complementing urbanity manuals like that of Manuel Antonio Carreño (1854), to configure disciplined subjectivities in a society with blurred socioracial differences, hiding tensions such as dependence on slave or manumitted labor. Its major exhibitors were Próspero Rey, who popularized the format in Caracas with his salon from 1862; Martín Tovar y Tovar, associated with José Antonio Salas in a workshop from 1865; and F. C. Lessmann, active in the 1890s, along with other studios that produced thousands of copies for social exchanges and family albums.

== Australia ==
In Australia Manchester-born William Davies began his photographic career with Walter Woodbury (inventor of the Woodburytype) and established several studios in Melbourne from 1858. William Davies and Co at 98 Bourke St, being opposite the Theatre Royal, sold cartes de visite of famous actors, actresses and opera singers. The company also specialised in carte de visite portraits of Protestant clergymen posed as if writing their sermons. The Albury Banner and Wodonga Express of May 1863 finds it noteworthy that "a gentleman had occasion to advertise for a cook. Amongst other applications in answer to his advertisement was one from a "young lady" of the profession, enclosing her carte de visite and stating her salary."

== Gallery ==
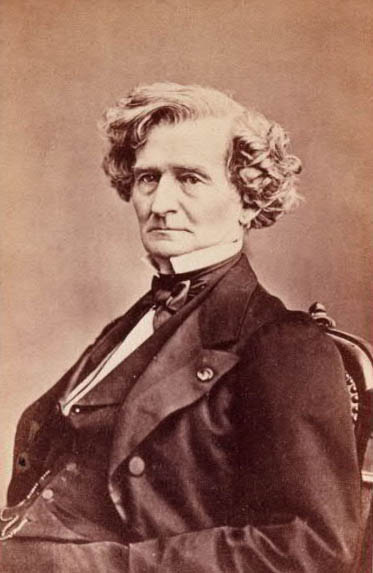
Hector Berlioz, c.1864

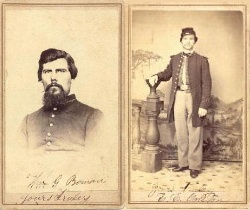
Two photographs taken during the American Civil War. Each soldier shown here served with the 77th Illinois Volunteer Infantry.

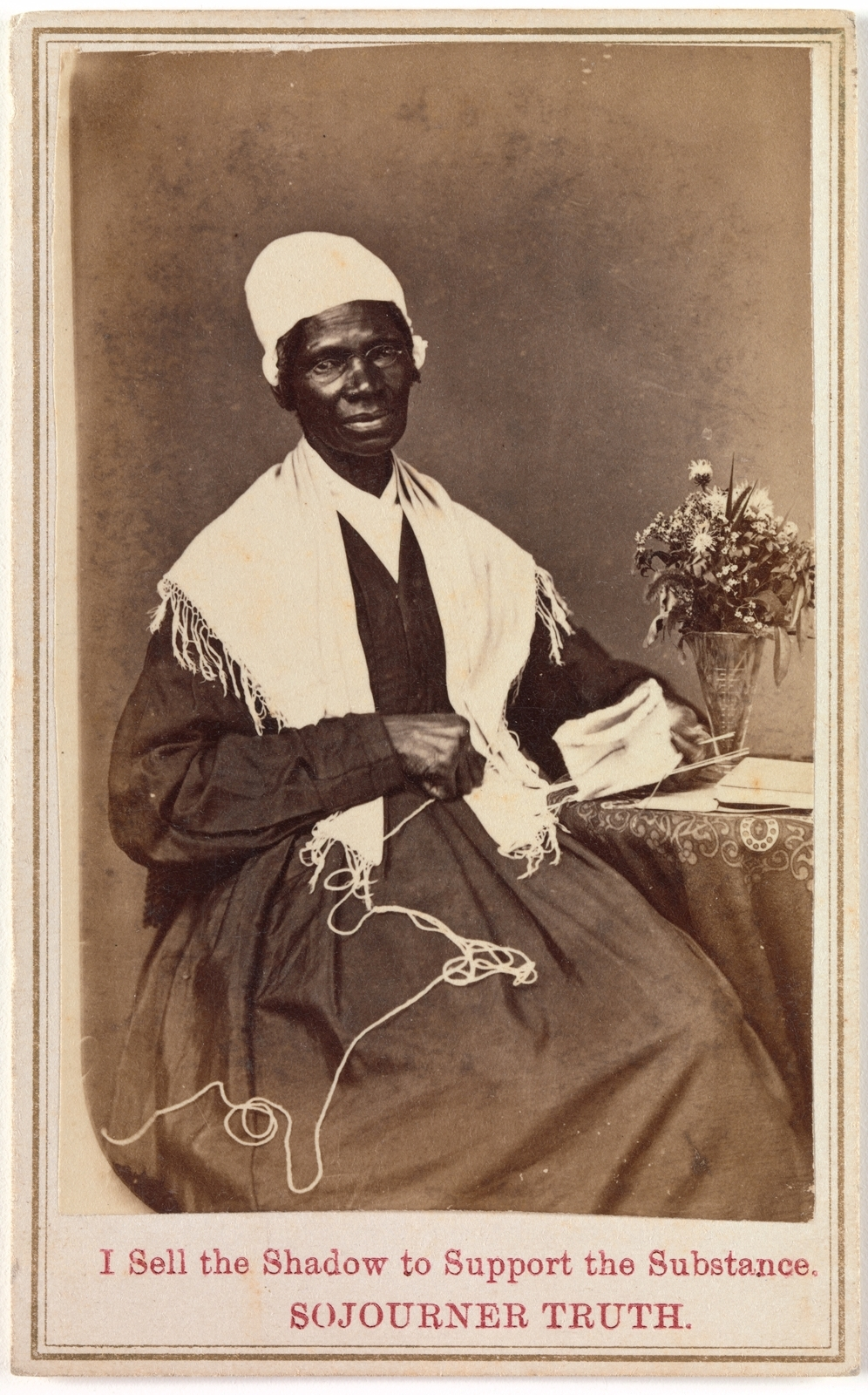
Sojourner Truth

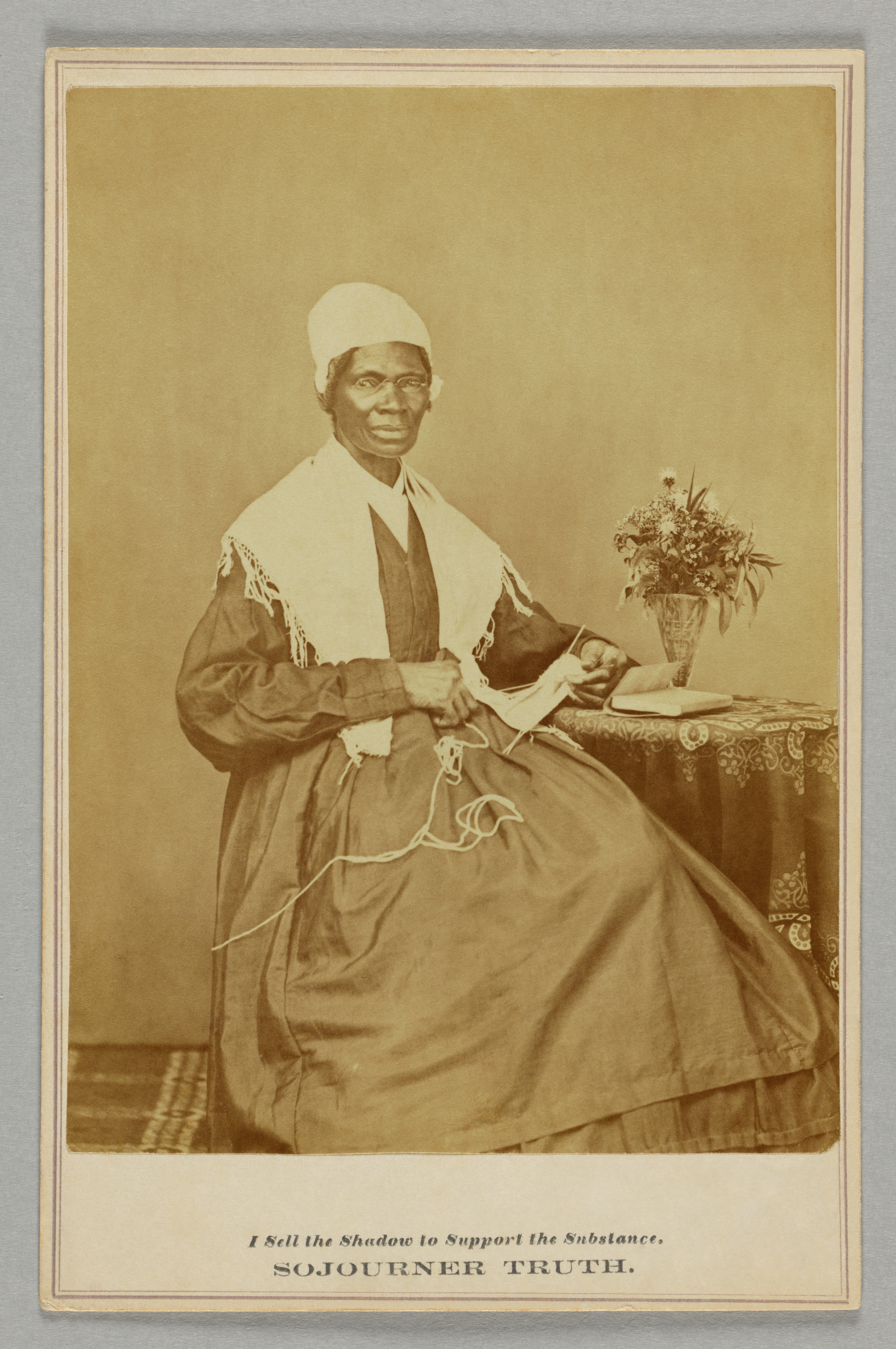
A later cabinet card of a similar image of Sojourner Truth.

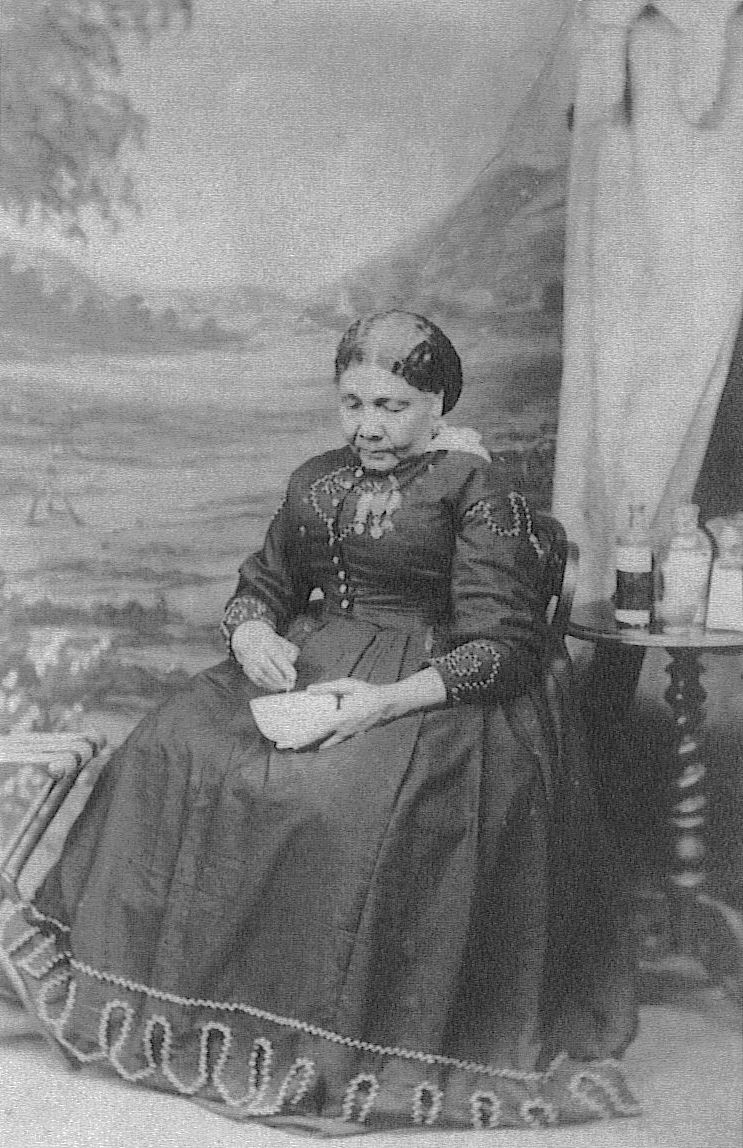
One of only two known photographs of Mary Seacole, taken by Maull & Company in London, c.1873.

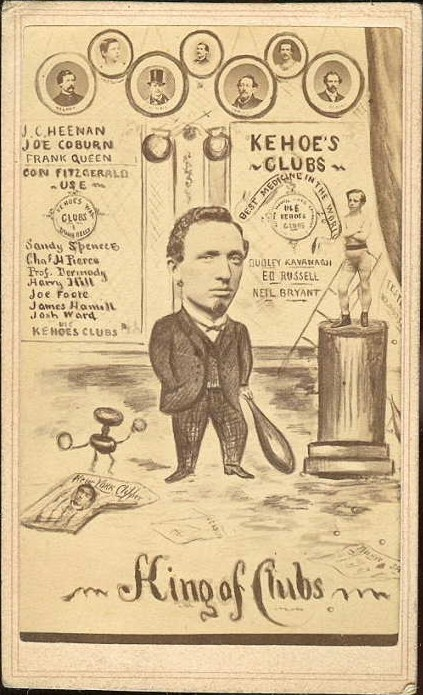
Sim D. Kehoe, who brought Indian-club exercising to the United States from England.

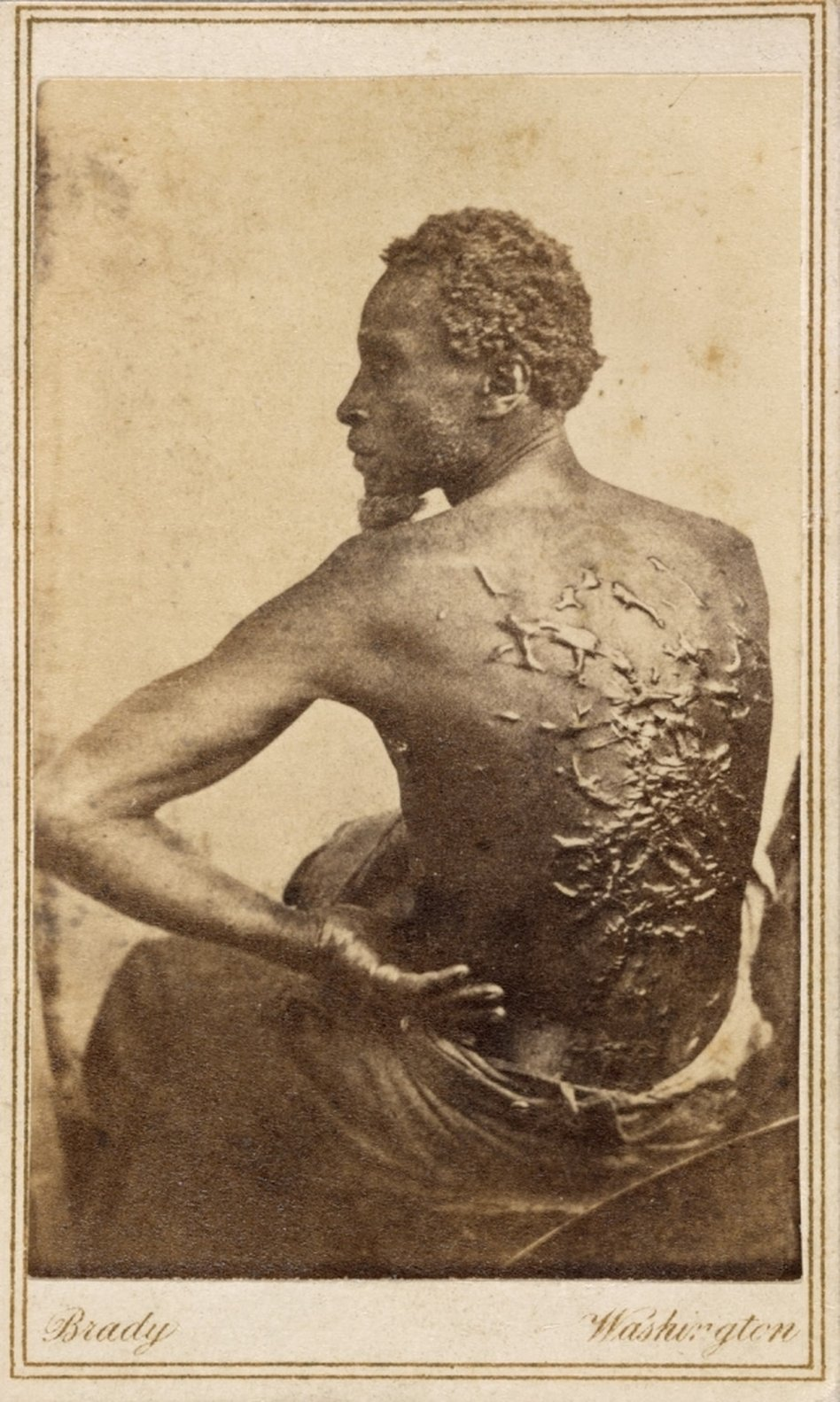
Gordon, an enslaved man, reproduced by Mathew Brady.

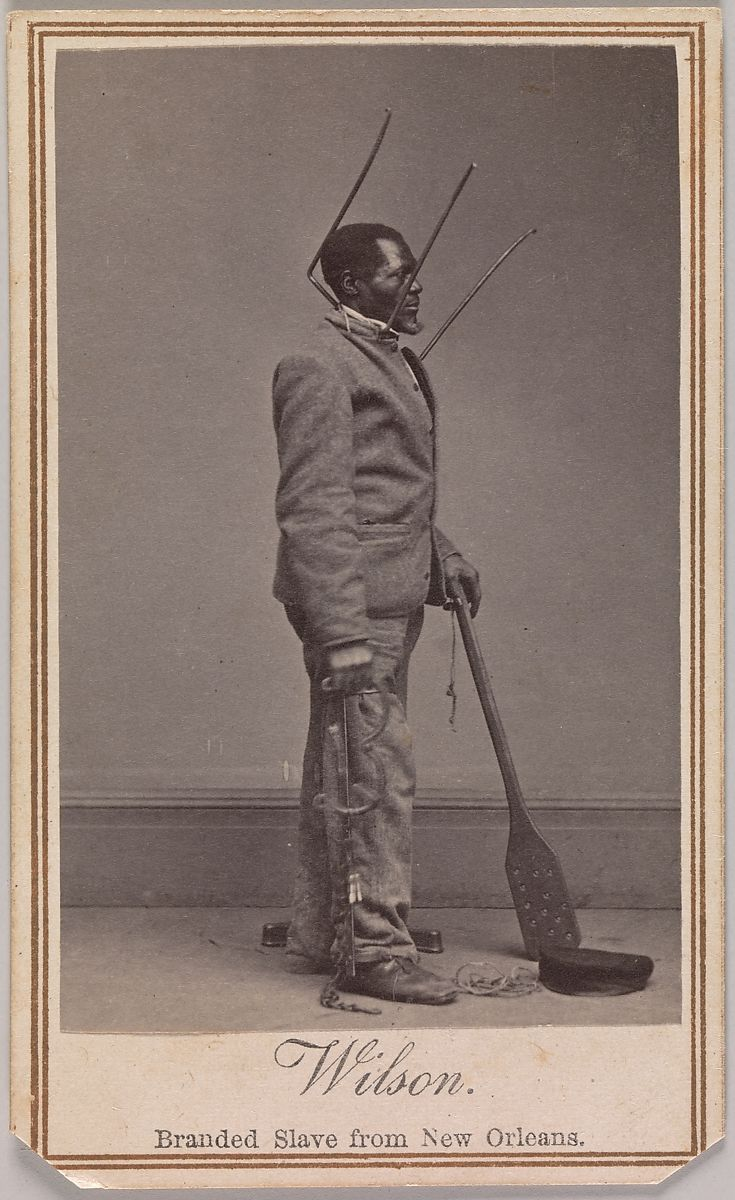
Wilson Chinn, a branded slave from Louisiana—Also exhibiting instruments of torture used to punish slaves

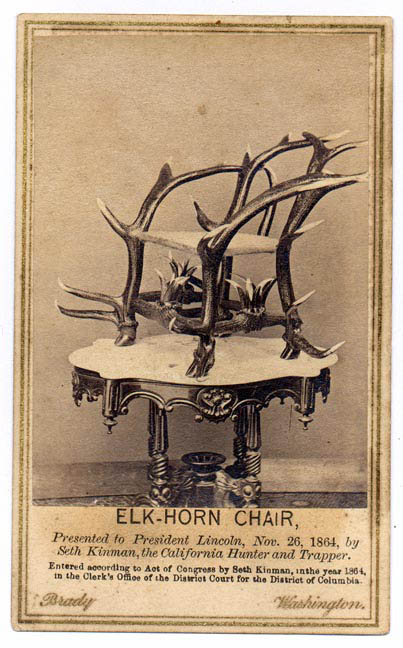
A chair presented by Kinman to Abraham Lincoln. Kinman sold cartes-de-visite in the U.S. Capitol.

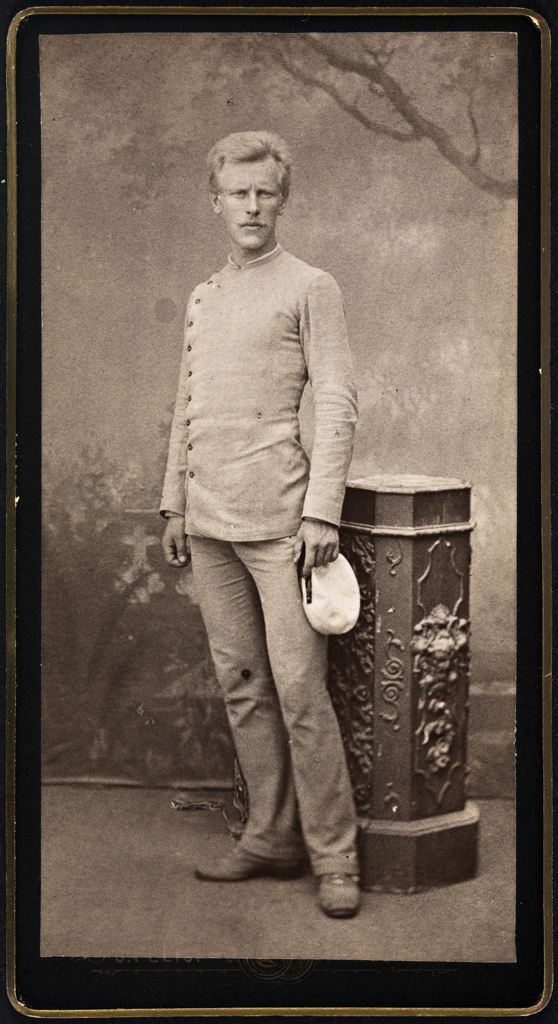
Fridtjof Nansen, Arctic explorer and scientist 1886.

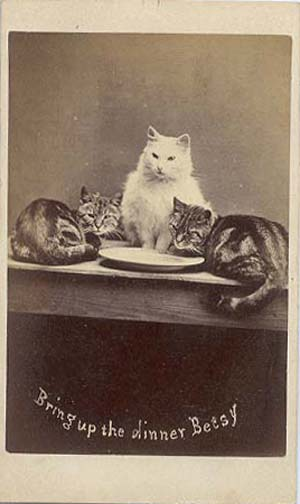
An early cat macro by British portrait photographer Harry Pointer, c.1870s.

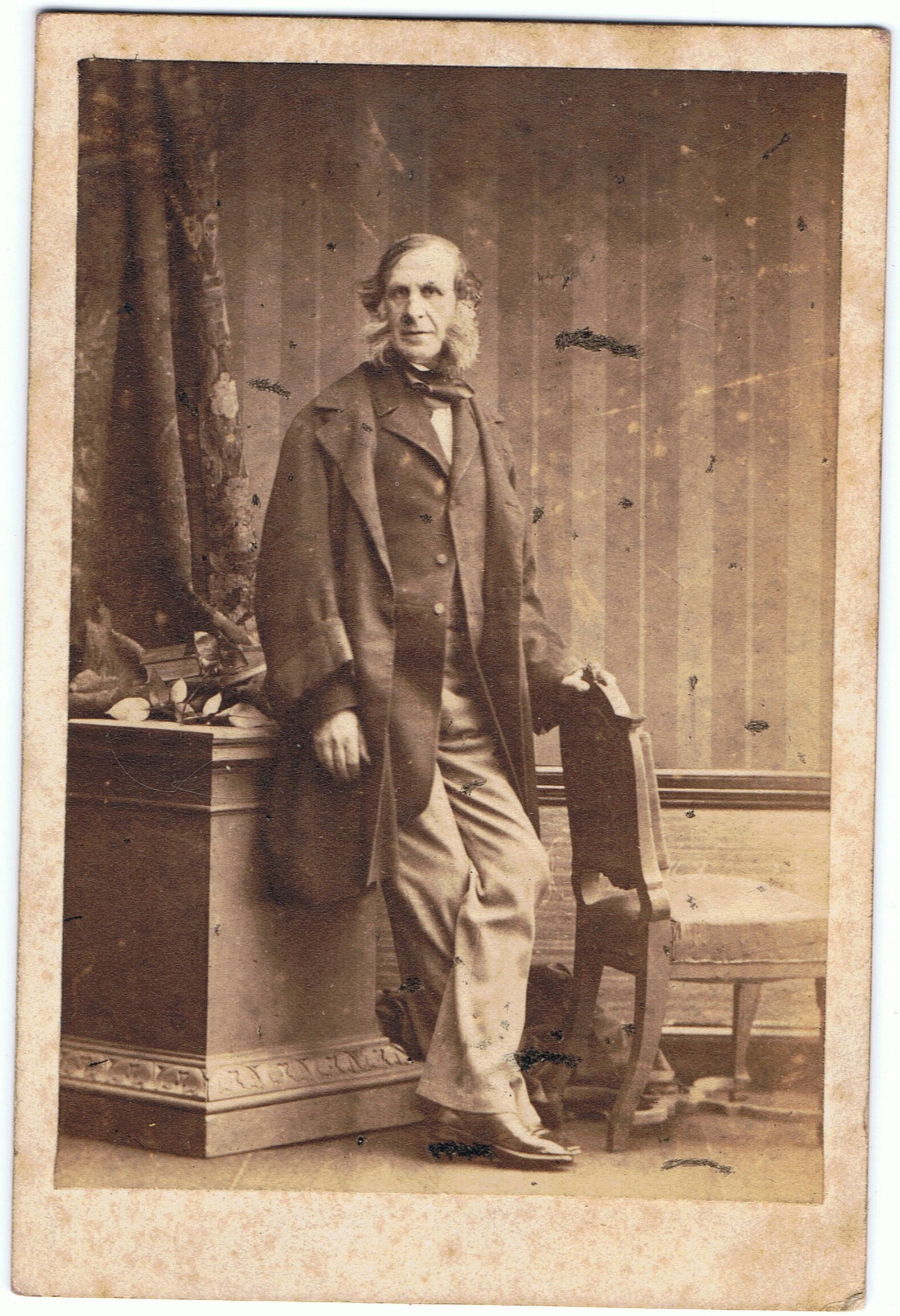
Camille Silvy's portrait of William Fane De Salis, London, 1861.

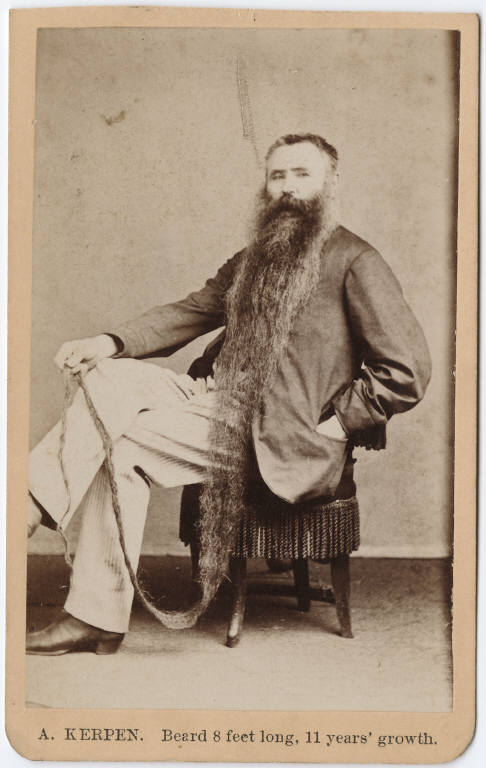
A. Kerpen. Beard 8 feet long, 11 years' growth

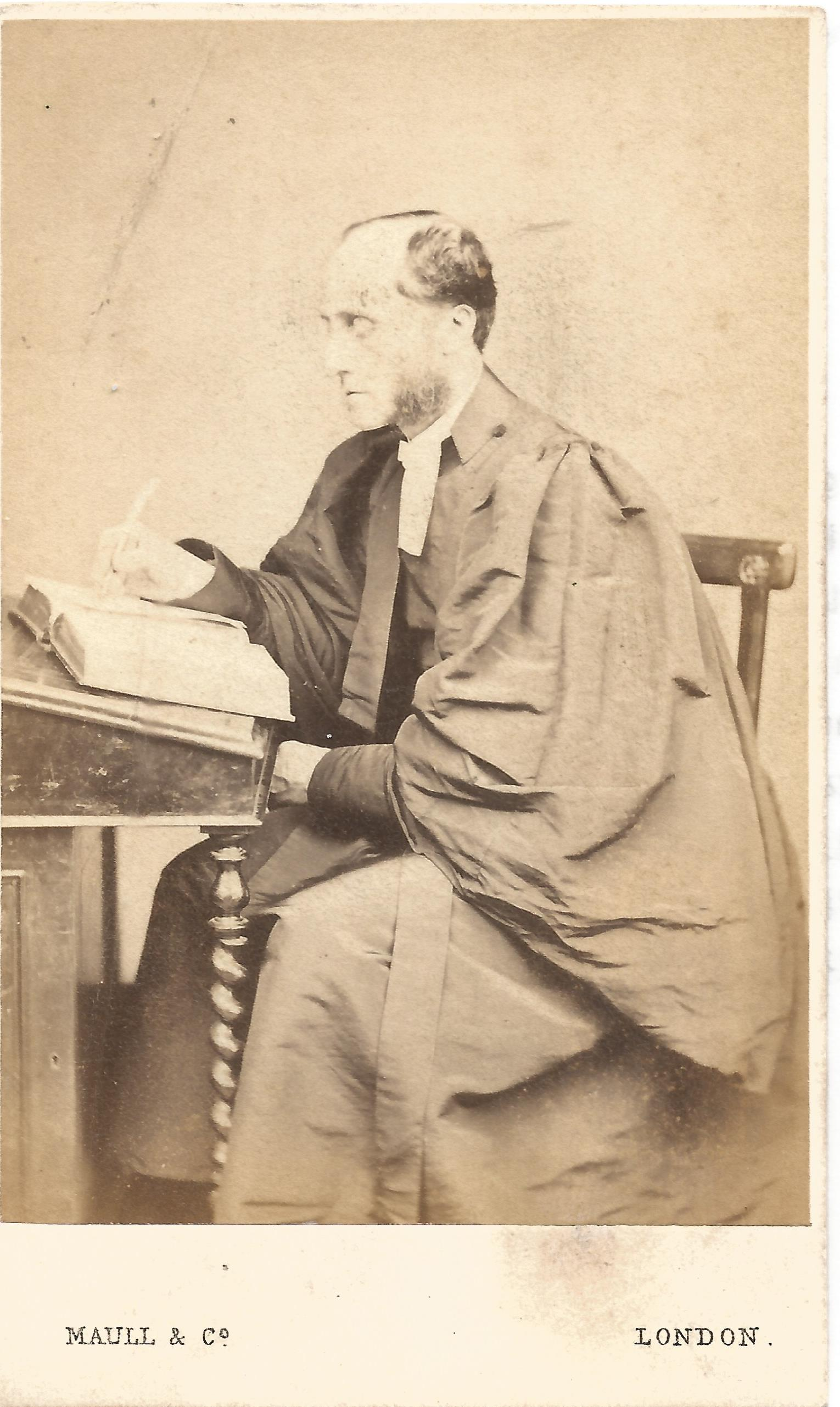
Rev. Christopher Newman Hall, British clergyman c.1860

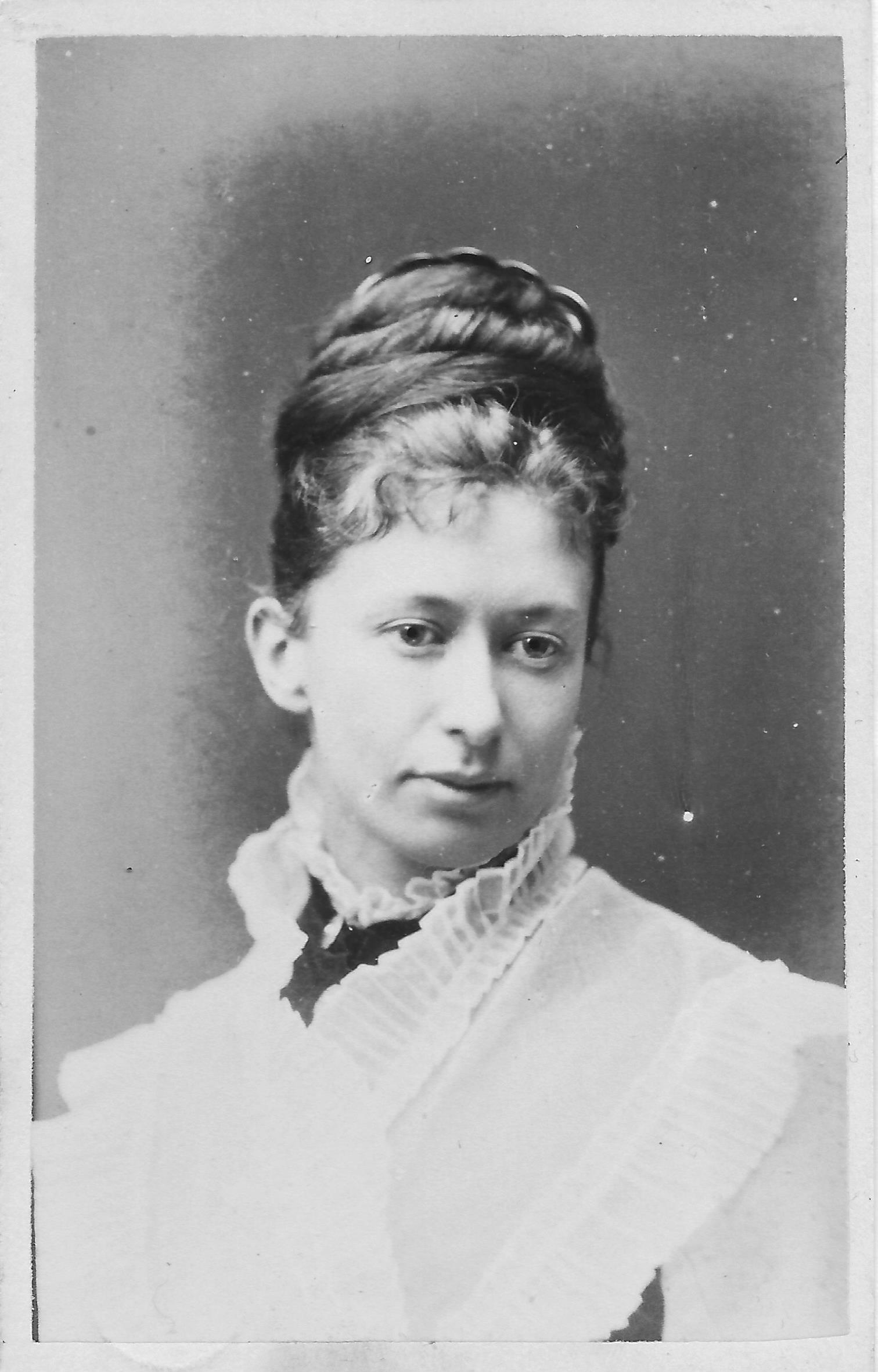
Elizabeth Thompson, military painter c.1875

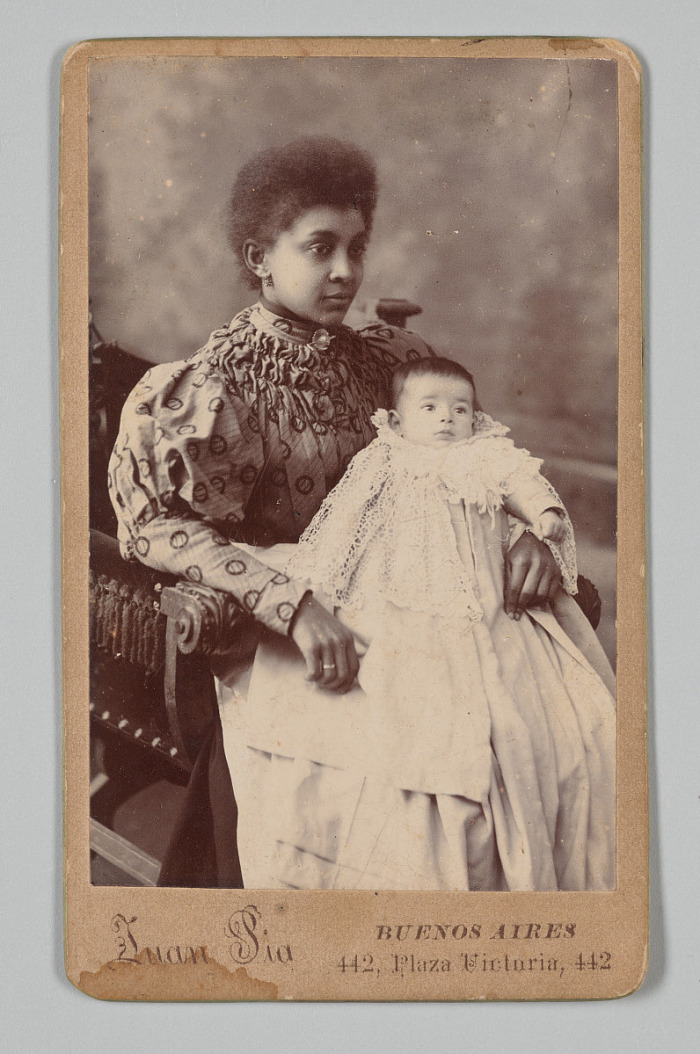
Portrait of a woman (probably a nanny) and an infant. Produced in Buenos Aires by Juan Pia. (Argentina)

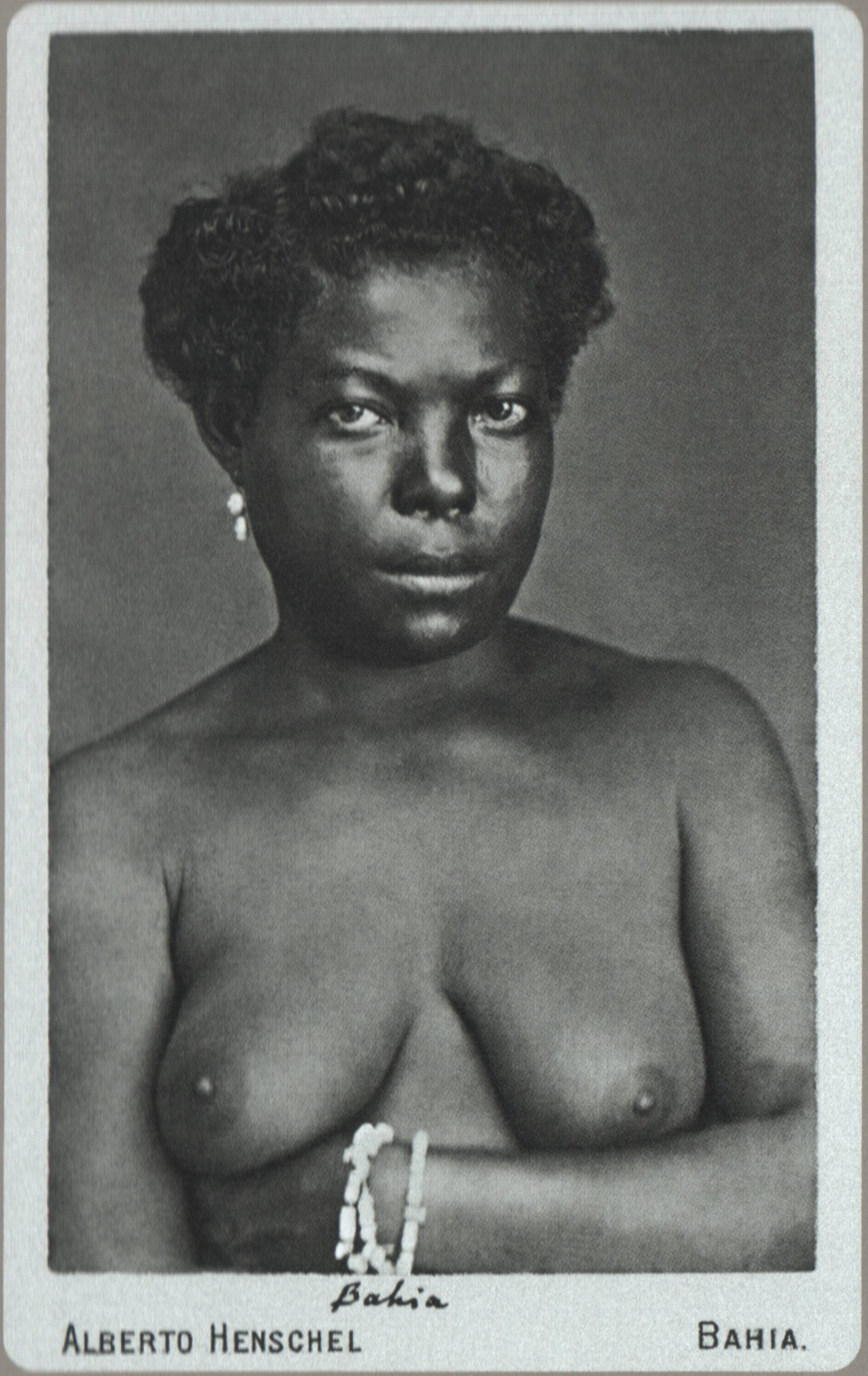
Carte de visite taken by German-Brazilian photographer Alberto Henschel, who broke paradigms by portraying blacks posing freely or well-dressed, slaves or free. (Brazil)

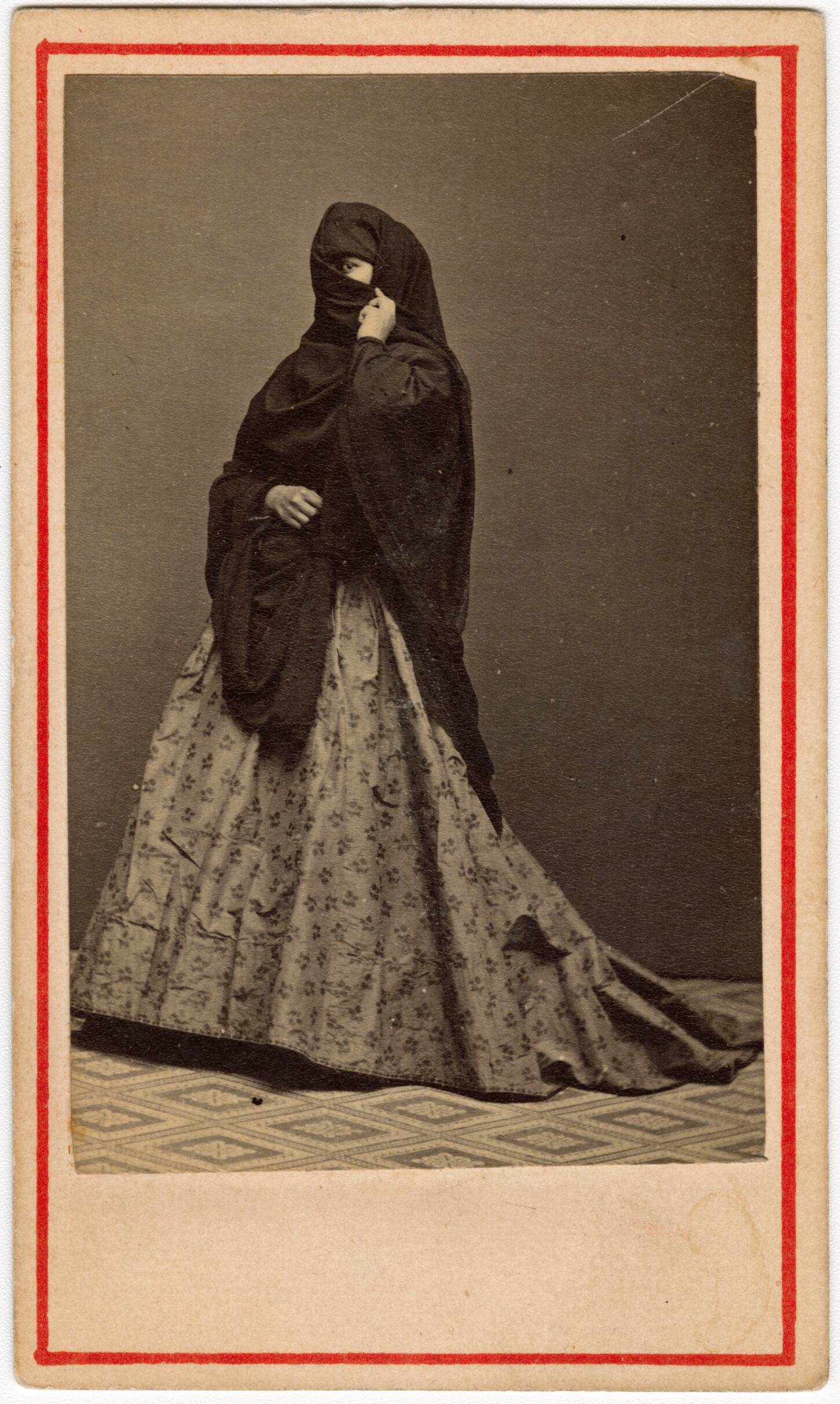
C. Clavijo, Unidentified woman, after 1868, carte de visite (Peru)

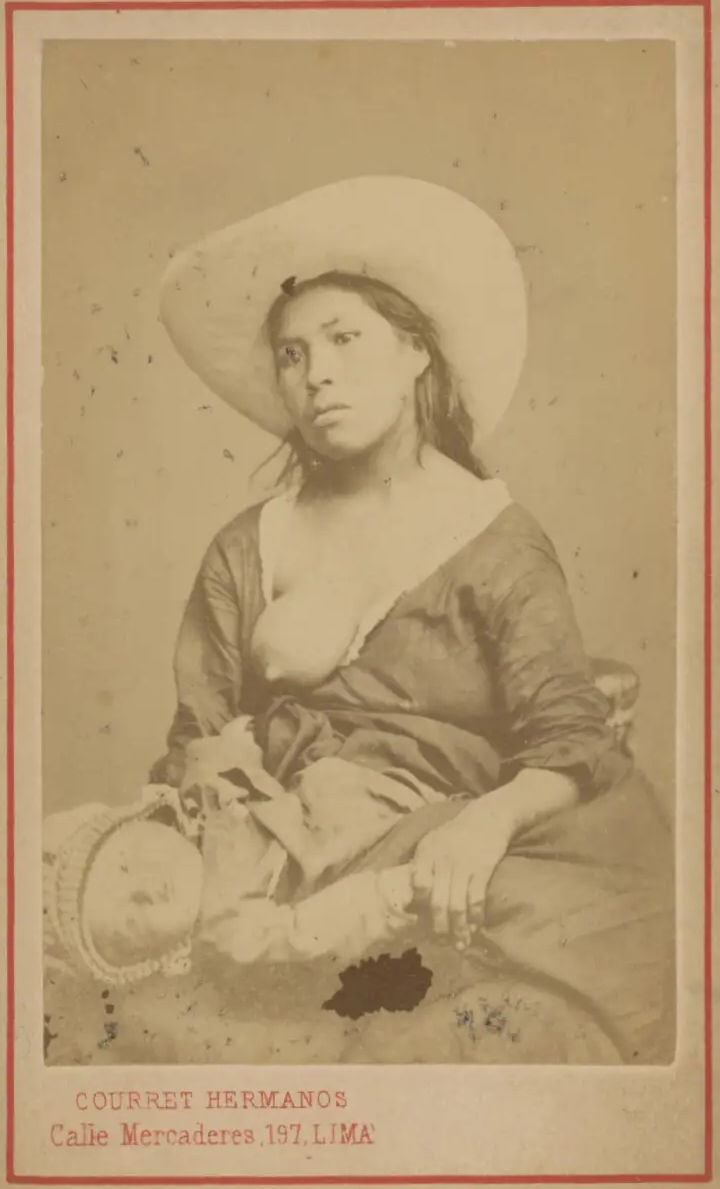
Photograph of a woman breastfeeding her child, by the Courret Brothers (Peru)

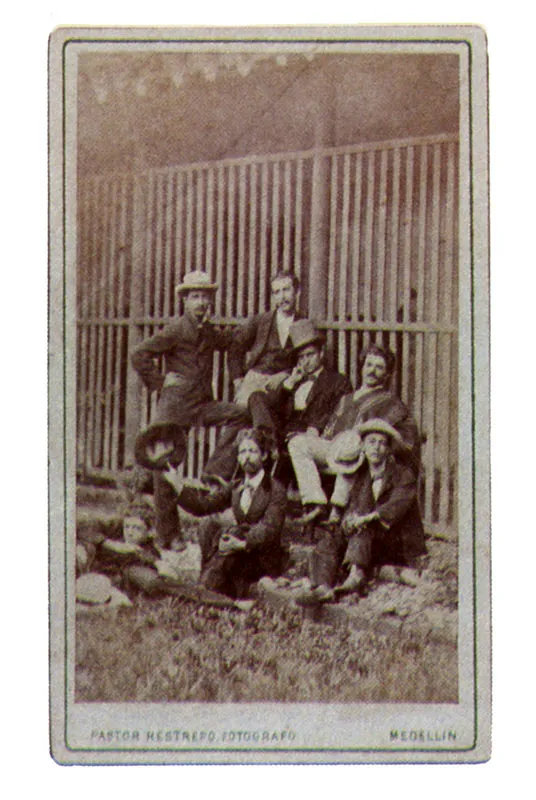
Group photograph of men, in Medellín, by Pastor Restrepo (Colombia)

== See also ==
- Business card
- Cabinet card
- Postcard
- Trading card
- Visiting card, a related but usually distinct item
