= Metrotyphlini =

Scientific classification
- Kingdom: Animalia
- Phylum: Arthropoda
- Clade: Pancrustacea
- Class: Insecta
- Order: Coleoptera
- Suborder: Polyphaga
- Infraorder: Staphyliniformia
- Family: Staphylinidae
- Subfamily: Leptotyphlinae
- Tribe: Metrotyphlini; Coiffait, 1963

Metrotyphlini is a tribe of rove beetles in the subfamily Leptotyphlinae. It was first described by Coiffait in 1963. It contains 31 accepted species split across 8 genera. The majority of recorded observations have been made in Romania, Montenegro, and France.

== Genera ==
- Apotyphlus
- Banatotyphlus
- Cretotyphlus
- Egeotyphlus
- Gynotyphlus
- Metrotyphlus
- Rhopalotyphlus
- Venezillotyphlus
