= Australiotyphlus =

Scientific classification
- Kingdom: Animalia
- Phylum: Arthropoda
- Clade: Pancrustacea
- Class: Insecta
- Order: Coleoptera
- Suborder: Polyphaga
- Infraorder: Staphyliniformia
- Family: Staphylinidae
- Subfamily: Leptotyphlinae
- Tribe: Australiotyphlini; Pace, 2014
- Genus: Australiotyphlus; Pace, 2014
- Species: A. cabbagensis

Binomial name
- Australiotyphlus cabbagensis Pace, 2014

Tribe of moths

Australiotyphlini is a tribe of rove beetles in the subfamily Leptotyphlinae. It was first described by Pace in 2014. It contains one genus, Australiotyplus, with one species, Australiotyphlus cabbagensis.
