= Entomoculiini =

Scientific classification
- Domain: Eukaryota
- Kingdom: Animalia
- Phylum: Arthropoda
- Class: Insecta
- Order: Coleoptera
- Suborder: Polyphaga
- Infraorder: Staphyliniformia
- Family: Staphylinidae
- Subfamily: Leptotyphlinae
- Tribe: Entomoculiini; Coiffait, 1957

Genera
- Allotyphlus; Cyrtotyphlus; Entomoculias; Mesotyphlus; Neocyrtotyphlus; Paratyphlus

Tribe of beetles

Entomoculiini is a tribe of rove beetles in the subfamily Leptotyphlinae.
