= Cephalotyphlini =

Scientific classification
- Kingdom: Animalia
- Phylum: Arthropoda
- Clade: Pancrustacea
- Class: Insecta
- Order: Coleoptera
- Suborder: Polyphaga
- Infraorder: Staphyliniformia
- Family: Staphylinidae
- Subfamily: Leptotyphlinae
- Tribe: Cephalotyphlini; Coiffait, 1963

Tribe of beetles

Cephalotyphlini is a tribe of rove beetles in the subfamily Leptotyphlinae. It was first described in 1963 by Coiffait. It consists of one genus, with four accepted species.

== Genus and species ==
- Cephalotyphlus
  - Cephalotyphlus florentinus
  - Cephalotyphlus revelierei
  - Cephalotyphlus sarduspatris
  - Cephalotyphlus vicetinus
