= Frederick York =

English photographer and manufacturer

Frederick Arlington Viler York (1823–1903) was an early 19th-century photographer, active first in Somerset, England, and from 1855 to 1861 in Cape Town, Cape Colony, modern-day South Africa. In February 1861, he received the first carte-de-visite camera in South Africa as a present from H.R.H. Prince Alfred. Upon return to the United Kingdom in 1865, he established the business York & Son in Notting Hill, London, specialising in the manufacture of lantern slides.
