= Neotyphlini =

Scientific classification
- Kingdom: Animalia
- Phylum: Arthropoda
- Clade: Pancrustacea
- Class: Insecta
- Order: Coleoptera
- Suborder: Polyphaga
- Infraorder: Staphyliniformia
- Family: Staphylinidae
- Subfamily: Leptotyphlinae
- Tribe: Neotyphlini; Coiffait, 1963

Neotyphlini is a tribe of rove beetles in the subfamily Leptotyphlinae. It was first described by Coiffait in 1963. It contains 50 accepted species split across 20 genera. Recorded observations have been primarily made in the United States, Austria, and Romania.

== Genera ==
- Apheliotyphlus
- Cafrotyphlus
- Cainotyphlus
- Chilityphlus
- Chionotyphlus
- Cubanotyphlus
- Eutyphlops
- Heterotyphlus
- Homeotyphlus
- Idahotyphlus
- Kladotyphlus
- Macrotyphlus
- Mayatyphlus
- Megatyphlus
- Neotyphlus
- Oreinotyphlus
- Paramacrotyphlus
- Prototyphlus
- Telotyphlus
- Xenotyphlus
