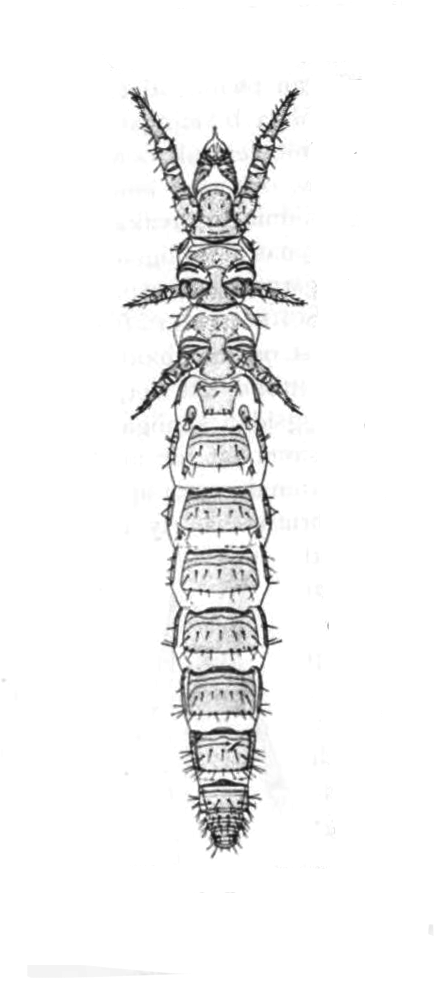

Scientific classification
- Kingdom: Animalia
- Phylum: Arthropoda
- Clade: Pancrustacea
- Class: Entognatha
- Order: Protura
- Family: Acerentomidae
- Genus: Acerentomon
- Species: A. doderoi

Binomial name
- Acerentomon doderoi Silvestri, 1907

= Acerentomon doderoi =

Species of insect-like animal

Acerentomon doderoi was the first proturan species to be described. The specimen was collected by Agostino Dodero and named after him by Italian entomologist Filippo Silvestri in 1907.
