= Leptotyphlini =

Scientific classification
- Kingdom: Animalia
- Phylum: Arthropoda
- Clade: Pancrustacea
- Class: Insecta
- Order: Coleoptera
- Suborder: Polyphaga
- Infraorder: Staphyliniformia
- Family: Staphylinidae
- Subfamily: Leptotyphlinae
- Tribe: Leptotyphlini; Fauvel, 1874

Tribe of beetles

Leptotyphlini is a tribe of rove beetles in the subfamily Leptotyphlinae. It was first described in 1874 by Fauvel. It consists of 264 accepted species split between 10 genera. The majority of recorded observations have taken place in France and the surrounding area.

== Genera ==
- Afrotyphlus
- Eotyphlus
- Epalxotyphlus
- Hesperotyphlus
- Kenotyphlus
- Kilimatyphlus
- Leptotyphlus
- Newtonius
- Portotyphlus
- Sekotyphlus
