= Próspero Rey =

Venezuelan photographer (1833–1904)

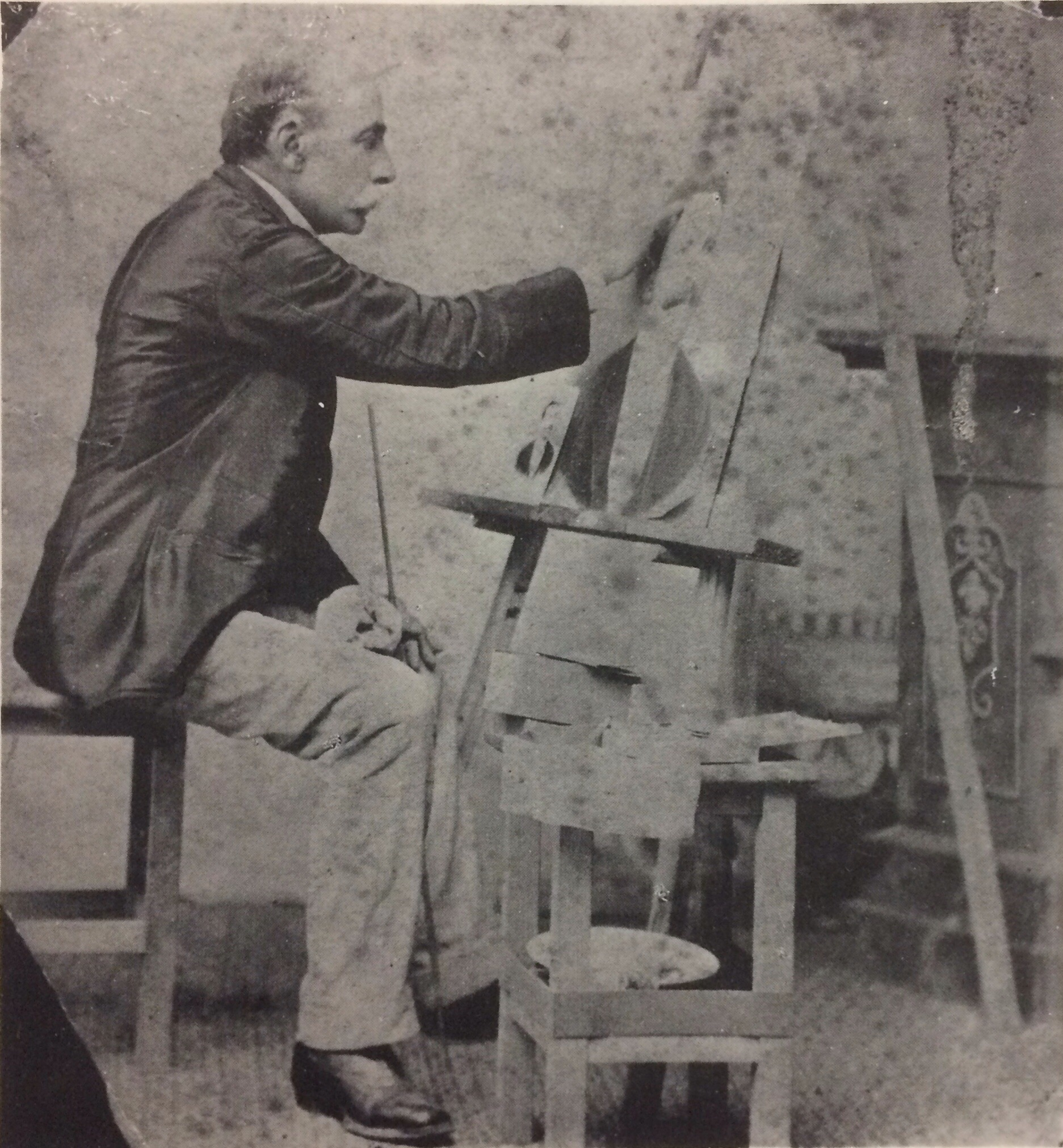
- Born: July 3, 1833; Caracas
- Died: May 8, 1904 (aged 70); Caracas
- Occupation: Photographer

Próspero Rey (3 July 1833 – 8 May 1904) was a Venezuelan photographer who contributed to the development of photographic practice in 19th-century Venezuela.

== Biography ==
Rey was born to French merchant Próspero Rey and Josefa Mederos. He was baptised as Próspero Agustín at the Iglesia Parroquial de San Pablo on 10 November 1833. By 1857, Rey was producing daguerreotypes, advertising precision in color reproduction and proportional rendering of hands.

=== Photographic work ===
In 1858, Rey established a studio at Esquina de Pajaritos in Caracas, charging between two and seven pesos for portraits according to size. By 1860, he had transitioned to ambrotype and wet-collodion processes. In 1862, he introduced carte de visite portraits with plain and landscape backgrounds. That year, he also married Ercilia Rodríguez.

Rey's studio, known as Galería de Cristal, relied on natural light, which limited operating hours during periods of poor weather. By late 1862, his work demonstrated technical improvements in tonal gradation and shadow detail. In 1863, his studio relocated to Esquina de La Palma, where he produced portraits of prominent figures, including General Juan Crisóstomo Falcón in 1864. In 1866, Rey advertised magic lanterns. The following year, he entered a partnership with Celestino Martínez, whose paintings were displayed in Rey's studio.

=== Recognition ===
Rey and José Antonio Salas were the only photographers to participate in the inaugural "Exposición anual de bellas artes venezolanas." In 1877, he was appointed to the newly established Academia de Dibujo y Pintura at the Instituto de Bellas Artes.

=== Death ===
Rey died in Caracas on 8 May 1904. His work is preserved by the Biblioteca Nacional de Venezuela, Fundación Boulton, and Museo de Ciudad Bolívar.

== Gallery ==
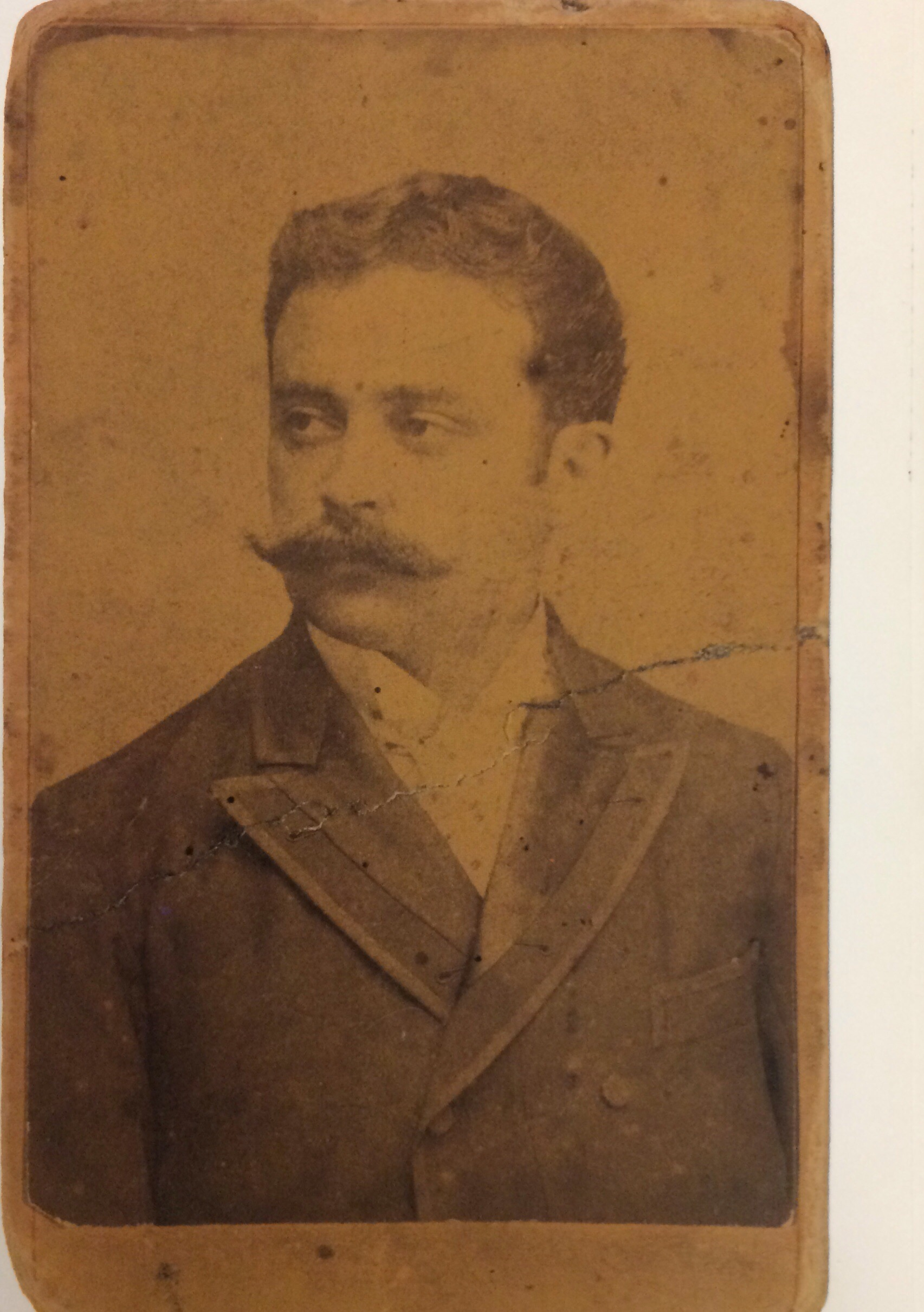
Próspero Rey, son. Photograph from his father's studio. He participated in the Atlanta photographic exhibition (1895), where he won a medal.

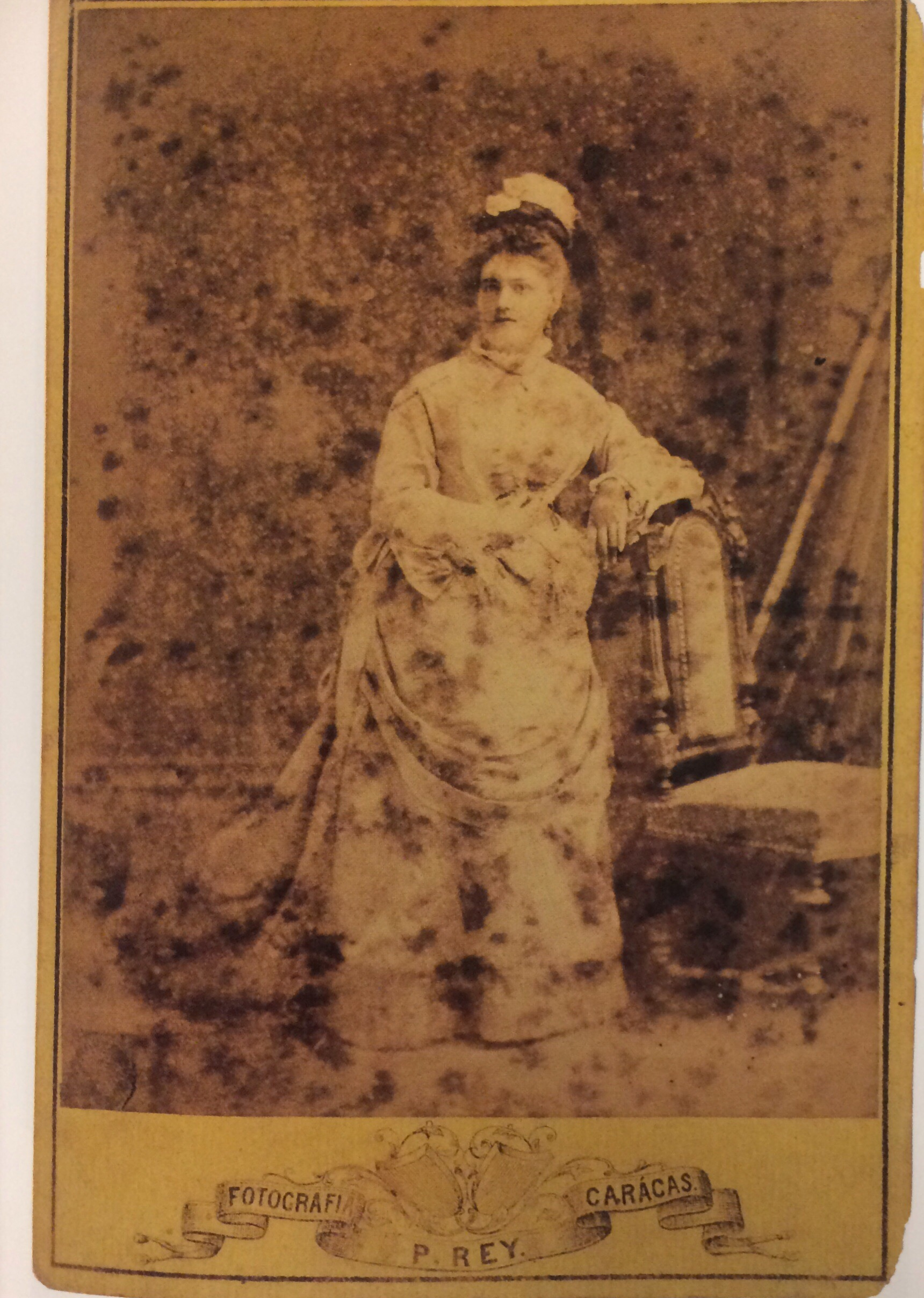
Próspero Rey, Portrait of Doña Belén Estévez Alcántara, wife of President Francisco Linares Alcántara. Reproduced in Manuel Barroso Alfaro, Historia documentada de la fotografía en Venezuela, 1996.

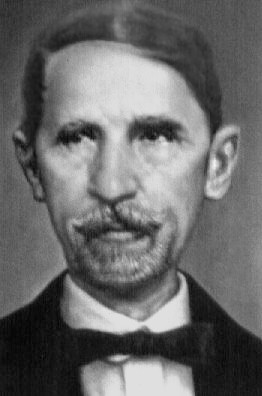
Only known photograph of Juan Pablo Duarte, taken by Próspero Rey in 1873 using the ambrotype technique at his studio Salón de Cristal-Galería Fotográfica.

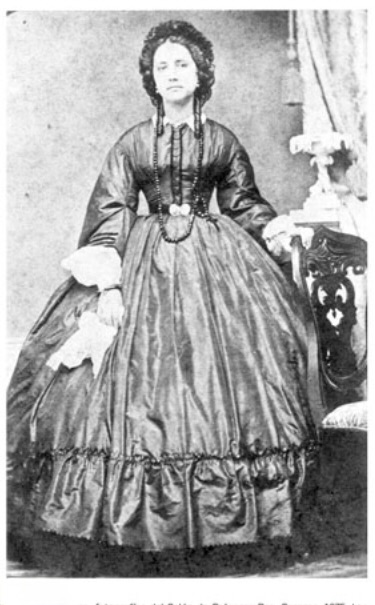
Example of a carte de visite portrait produced in Venezuela during the 19th century.
