= Dondero =

Dondero is a surname. Notable people with the surname include:

- David Dondero (born 1969), singer-songwriter
- George Anthony Dondero (1883–1968), politician
- Len Dondero (1903–1999), baseball player

== See also ==
- Dondero High School in Royal Oak, Michigan
