= Louis Dodero =

French photographer

- Born: 6 September 1824; Genoa, Duchy of Genoa
- Died: 18 December 1902 (aged 78); Six-Fours-les-Plages, France
- Occupation: Photographer

Louis Dodero (6 September 1824 – 18 December 1902) was a French photographer from Marseilles. He is credited with inventing the carte de visite in 1851. However, another photographer, André-Adolphe-Eugène Disdéri patented this type of photograph on November 27, 1854.
