= Andrew Wynter =

English author and physician (1819–1876)

Andrew Wynter (6 June 1819 – 12 May 1876) was an English physician and author.

== Life ==
Born in Bristol, Wynter studied medicine at St George's Hospital and set up a London practice. He edited the British Medical Journal 1845–60, took a M.D. in 1853 and became a member of the College of Physicians in 1861.

He was a frequent contributor to periodicals, including Ainsworth's Magazine, the Cornhill Magazine, Fraser's Magazine, the Edinburgh Review, the Quarterly Review, the London Review, Good Words, and Once a Week. Many of his contributions were collected and reissued as books.

As a doctor, Wynter specialized in insanity, taking wealthy patients as residents at his Chiswick home.

He died in Chiswick.

== Works ==
- Pictures of Town from my Mental Camera (1855), by 'Werdna Retnyw'
- Odds and Ends from an Old Drawer (1855), by 'Werdna Retnyw'
- Curiosities of Civilisation: being Essays from the Quarterly and Edinburgh Reviews (1860)
- Our Social Bees: Pictures of Town and Country, and other Essays (1861)
- Subtle Brains and Lissom Fingers: being some of the Chisel-Marks of our Industrial and Scientific Progress (1863; 1877 enlarged ed., revised by Andrew Steinmetz)
- Curiosities of Toil (1870)
- Peeps into the Human Hive (1874, 2 vols)
- Fruit between the Leaves (1875, 2 vols)
- The Borderlands of Insanity and other Allied Papers (1875; 1877 enlarged ed., revised by J. M. Granville)
