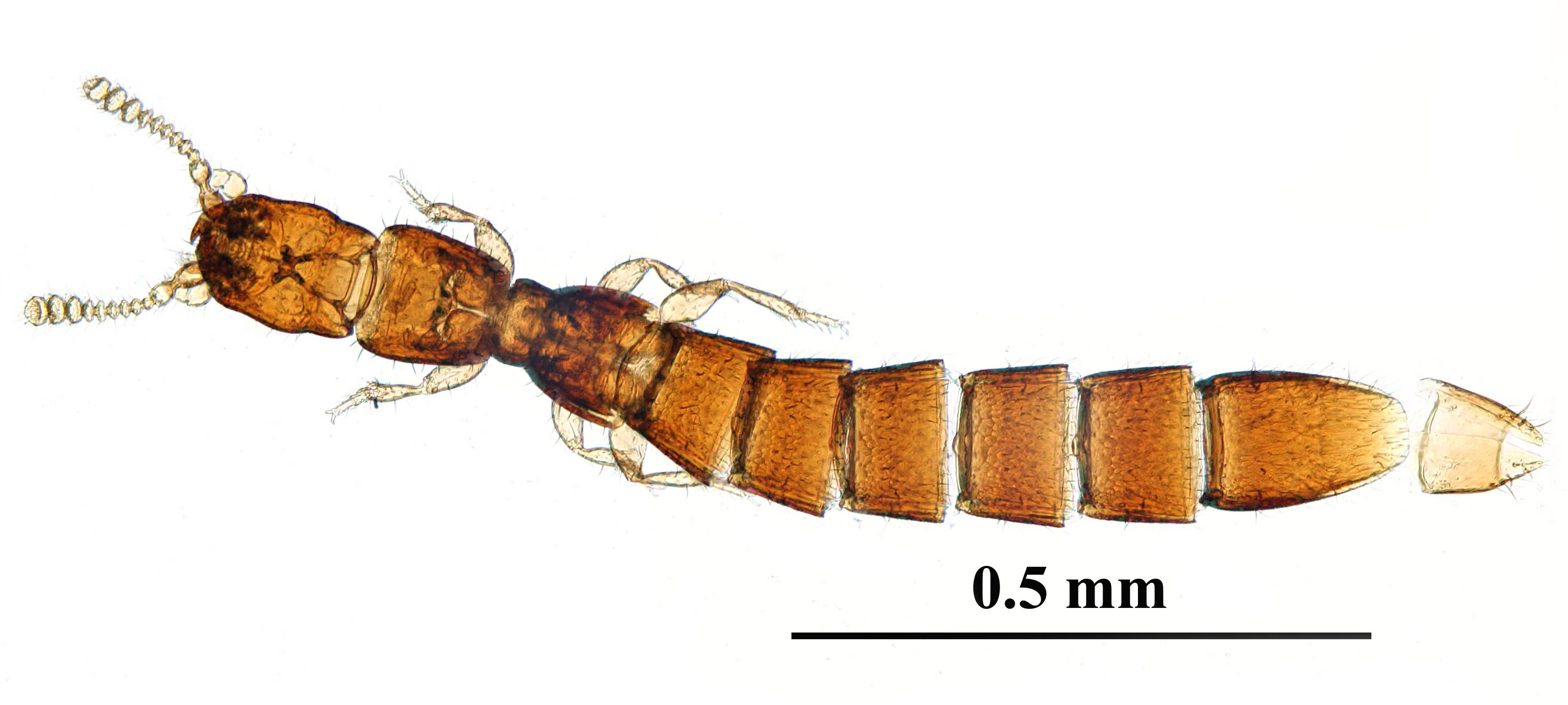

Scientific classification
- Kingdom: Animalia
- Phylum: Arthropoda
- Clade: Pancrustacea
- Class: Insecta
- Order: Coleoptera
- Suborder: Polyphaga
- Infraorder: Staphyliniformia
- Family: Staphylinidae
- Subfamily: Leptotyphlinae; Fauvel, 1874

Tribes
- Australiotyphlini; Cephalotyphlini; Entomoculiini; Leptotyphlini; Metrotyphlini; Neotyphlini

= Leptotyphlinae =

Subfamily of beetles

The Leptotyphlinae are a subfamily of the Staphylinidae, rove beetles. They are very small, less than 1.8 mm long, and are eyeless and wingless. These beetles appear to have seven abdominal segments, and 3-3-3 is their tarsal formula. They are found in leaf litter or deep soil, possibly as predators of mites, collembola, and other soil arthropods. Nine genera and 13 species are known from North America, in western states and Florida, but they may be more widespread.
