= Agostino Dodero =

Italian entomologist (1864–1937)

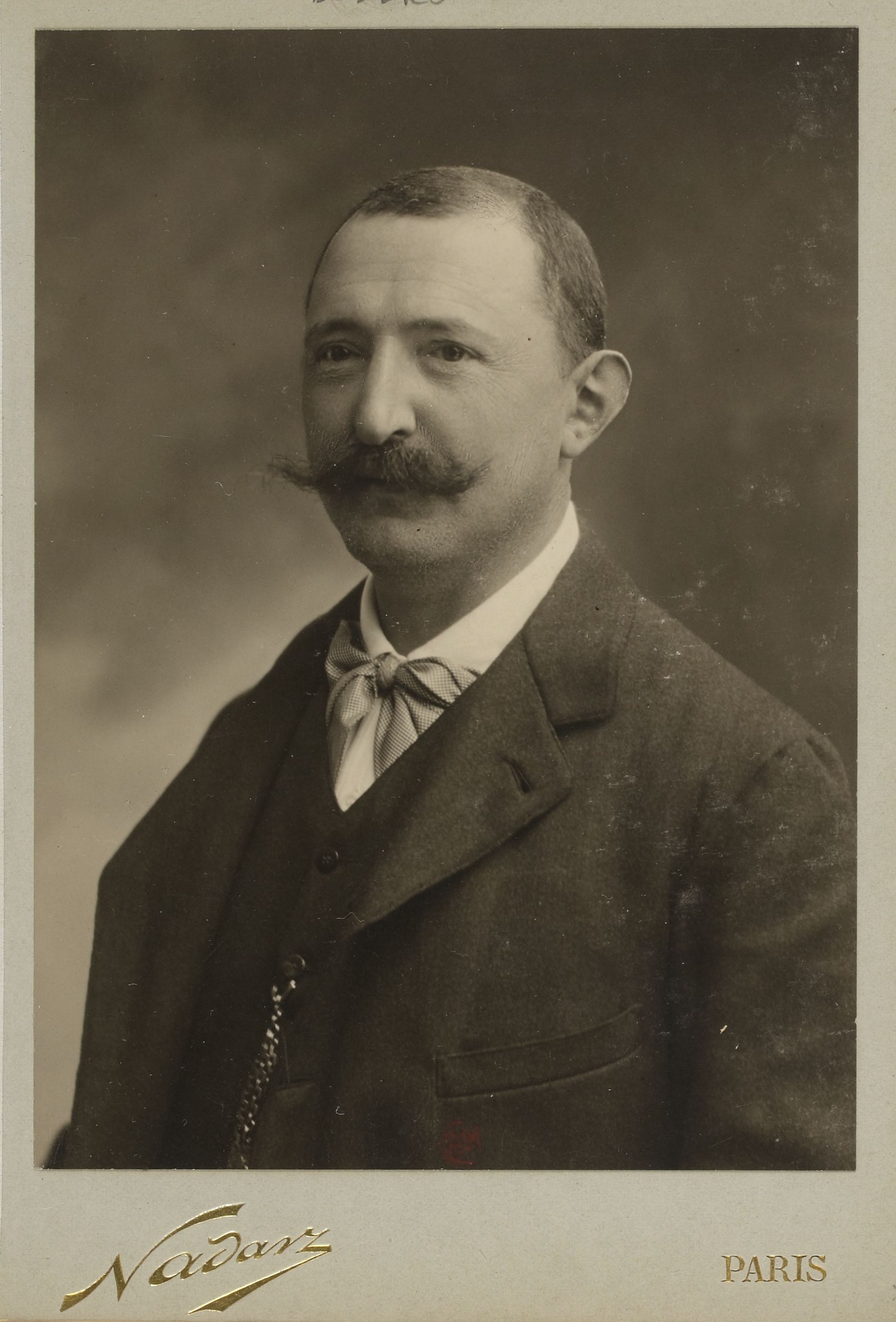
Portrait c. 1905

Agostino Dodero (28 March 1864 – 14 November 1937) was an Italian entomologist. A major collector of insects, particularly beetles and known for his collections of subterranean species, he is credited with the discovery of the first Protura specimens.

Dodero was born in Genoa where his father was an esteemed shopkeeper. He began collecting beetles at the age of 17 from around his villa La Torre near the waterfront. He collected from further afield as he grew up. Meeting Tomaso Derosas influenced him further as a collector and went on expeditions each summer. A pious man, many of his friends were priests who helped him on his travels. Thus he collected extensively in the region surrounding the Sanctuary of Oropa. Hiring workers to lift stones and dig for subterranean beetles for his collections, he was the first to identify blind ants of the genus Leptanilla in Italy and the first to collect what are now called Proturans. The first Protura specimens were collected by Dodero on 5 June 1907 in the Botanical Garden of the University in Genova. He found more in the Ligurian mountains and unable to identify them, he passed on the specimens to Professor Filippo Silvestri. Silvestri called the species Acerentomon doderoi and created the order Protura. The family Doderiidae, the genera Doderia, Doderoella, Doderotrechus and Agostina; and numerous species (with the names doderi, doderona, doderoana and agostini) were named from his collections. He offered to donate his collections to the Genoa Museum in November 1914 on the condition that a curator of his choice would be appointed to take care of his collection. This was not accepted and he finally bequeathed his collections to a company. He was a smoker of cigars and many of his specimens were stored in Minghetti cigar boxes. He died from lung cancer. His wife Adele died on 12 June 1952 and was buried alongside him at the Monumental Cemetery of Staglieno.

== Publications ==
Dodero's major publications include:

- Dodero, A. 1900: Materiali per lo studio dei Coleotteri italiani con descrizioni di nuove specie. Annali del Museo civico di storia naturale di Genova 40 [=(2)20]: 400–419.
- Dodero, A. 1908. Contribuzione allo studio del genere Leptotyphlus Fauvel. Annali del Museo civico di storia naturale di Genova (3)3: 631–640.
