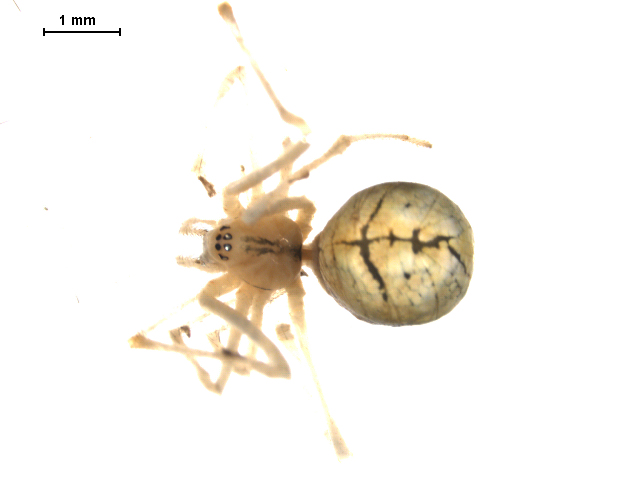
- T. frondeum, adult female
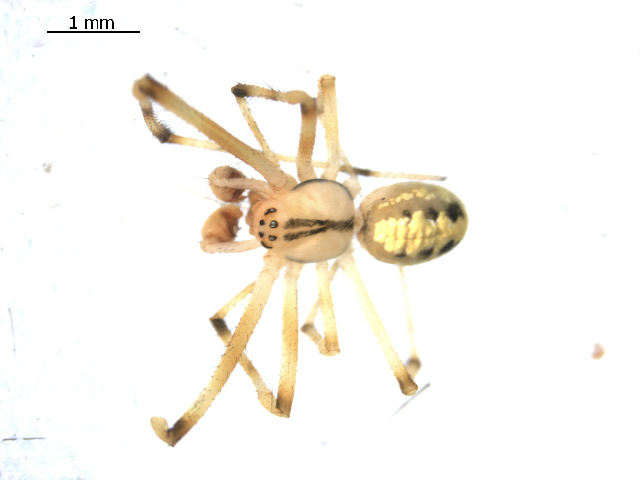
- T. frondeum, adult male

Scientific classification
- Kingdom: Animalia
- Phylum: Arthropoda
- Subphylum: Chelicerata
- Class: Arachnida
- Order: Araneae
- Infraorder: Araneomorphae
- Family: Theridiidae
- Genus: Theridion
- Species: T. frondeum

Binomial name
- Theridion frondeum Hentz, 1850

= Theridion frondeum =

Species of spider

Theridion frondeum is a species of cobweb spider in the family Theridiidae. It is found in the United States and Bahama Islands.
