= Theridion quadratum =

Scientific classification
- Kingdom: Animalia
- Phylum: Arthropoda
- Subphylum: Chelicerata
- Class: Arachnida
- Order: Araneae
- Infraorder: Araneomorphae
- Family: Theridiidae
- Genus: Theridion
- Species: T. quadratum

Binomial name
- Theridion quadratum (O. Pickard-Cambridge, 1882)

Species of spider

Theridion quadratum, is a species of spider of the genus Theridion. It is found only in Sri Lanka and Sumatra.
