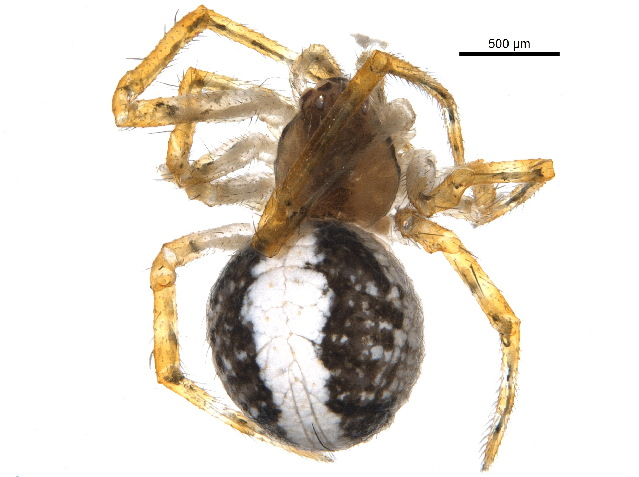
- Theridion lawrencei, immature

Scientific classification
- Kingdom: Animalia
- Phylum: Arthropoda
- Subphylum: Chelicerata
- Class: Arachnida
- Order: Araneae
- Infraorder: Araneomorphae
- Family: Theridiidae
- Genus: Theridion
- Species: T. lawrencei

Binomial name
- Theridion lawrencei Gertsch & Archer, 1942

= Theridion lawrencei =

Species of spider

Theridion lawrencei is a species of cobweb spider in the family Theridiidae. It is found in the United States.
