= Theridion albidorsum =

Scientific classification
- Kingdom: Animalia
- Phylum: Arthropoda
- Subphylum: Chelicerata
- Class: Arachnida
- Order: Araneae
- Infraorder: Araneomorphae
- Family: Theridiidae
- Genus: Theridion
- Species: T. albidorsum

Binomial name
- Theridion albidorsum Strand, 1909

Species of spider

Theridion albidorsum is a species of spider in the family Theridiidae. It is endemic to South Africa.

== Distribution ==
Theridion albidorsum is found only in South Africa. It is known from the Western Cape at Retreat Flats.

== Habitat and ecology ==
This species constructs three-dimensional webs in dark places. It has been sampled from the Fynbos biome at 37 m altitude.

== Description ==
Theridion albidorsum is known only from a juvenile specimen with a total length of 1.5 mm. The carapace is blackish brown with a central yellowish brown band. The abdomen is greyish brown.

== Conservation ==
Theridion albidorsum is listed as Data Deficient for taxonomic reasons by the South African National Biodiversity Institute. The species is known only from the type locality with a very small range. The status of the species remains obscure. More sampling is needed to collect the female and male and to determine the species range.

== Taxonomy ==
Theridion albidorsum was described by Embrik Strand in 1909 from Retreat Flats in the Western Cape. The species has not been revised and remains known only from juvenile specimens.
