= Theridion octoferum =

Scientific classification
- Kingdom: Animalia
- Phylum: Arthropoda
- Subphylum: Chelicerata
- Class: Arachnida
- Order: Araneae
- Infraorder: Araneomorphae
- Family: Theridiidae
- Genus: Theridion
- Species: T. octoferum

Binomial name
- Theridion octoferum Strand, 1909

Species of spider

Theridion octoferum is a species of spider in the family Theridiidae. It is endemic to South Africa.

== Distribution ==
Theridion octoferum is found only in South Africa. It is known from the Western Cape at Simonstown.

== Habitat and ecology ==
It has been sampled from the Fynbos biome at 125 m altitude.

== Description ==
Theridion octoferum is known only from a juvenile specimen with a total length of 1.7 mm. The carapace is brownish yellow with a wide black middle longitudinal band. The abdomen is deep black with white at the base forming a wide recurved band.

== Conservation ==
Theridion octoferum is listed as Data Deficient for taxonomic reasons by the South African National Biodiversity Institute. The species is known only from the type locality with a very small range. The status of the species remains obscure. More sampling is needed to collect adults to try and identify the species and to determine the species range.

== Taxonomy ==
Theridion octoferum was described by Embrik Strand in 1909 from Simonstown in the Western Cape based on a juvenile holotype. The species has not been revised and remains known only from juvenile specimens.
