= Theridion incertissimum =

Scientific classification
- Kingdom: Animalia
- Phylum: Arthropoda
- Subphylum: Chelicerata
- Class: Arachnida
- Order: Araneae
- Infraorder: Araneomorphae
- Family: Theridiidae
- Genus: Theridion
- Species: T. incertissimum

Binomial name
- Theridion incertissimum (Caporiacco, 1954)

Species of spider

Theridion incertissimum is a spider species found in French Guiana and Brazil.
