= Theridion durbanicum =

Durban Theridion comb-feet spider

Scientific classification
- Kingdom: Animalia
- Phylum: Arthropoda
- Subphylum: Chelicerata
- Class: Arachnida
- Order: Araneae
- Infraorder: Araneomorphae
- Family: Theridiidae
- Genus: Theridion
- Species: T. durbanicum

Binomial name
- Theridion durbanicum Lawrence, 1947

Species of spider

Theridion durbanicum is a species of spider in the family Theridiidae. It is endemic to South Africa and is commonly known as the Durban Theridion comb-feet spider.

== Distribution ==
Theridion durbanicum is found only in South Africa. It is known from KwaZulu-Natal at Durban Stamford Hill and Wakefield Farm.

== Habitat and ecology ==
This species builds a conical retreat of twigs and leaves in its three-dimensional web. It has been recorded from the Indian Ocean Coastal Belt biome at 17 m altitude.

== Description ==
The general background is cream. The cephalic portion of the carapace is bordered by a distinct yellow-brown margin and some similarly coloured stripes (six in number) radiating from the region of the thoracic striae. Legs are yellow-brown with pale femora in their basal third or half, tarsi and metatarsi a little darker than the prevailing colour. The sternum and coxae are pale, mouthparts yellow-brown. The abdomen is cream with four narrow well-defined stripes at the sides a little darker than the rest.

== Conservation ==
Theridion durbanicum is listed as Data Deficient for taxonomic reasons by the South African National Biodiversity Institute. The species is known from only two localities with a very small range. The status of the species remains obscure. More sampling is needed to collect the male and to determine the species range.

== Taxonomy ==
Theridion durbanicum was described by Reginald Frederick Lawrence in 1947 from Stamford Hill, Durban. The species has not been revised and is known only from the female.
