= Theridion squalidum =

Conservation status
- Data Deficit (NZ TCS)

Scientific classification
- Kingdom: Animalia
- Phylum: Arthropoda
- Subphylum: Chelicerata
- Class: Arachnida
- Order: Araneae
- Infraorder: Araneomorphae
- Family: Theridiidae
- Genus: Theridion
- Species: T. squalidum

Binomial name
- Theridion squalidum Urquhart, 1886

Species of spider

Theridion squalidum is a species of Theridiidae that is endemic to New Zealand.

== Taxonomy ==
This species was described in 1886 by Arthur Urquhart from a female specimen.

== Description ==
The female is recorded at 5mm in length.

== Distribution ==
This species is only known from Auckland, New Zealand.

== Conservation status ==
Under the New Zealand Threat Classification System, this species is listed as "Data Deficient" with the qualifiers of "Data Poor: Size", "Data Poor: Trend" and "One Location".
