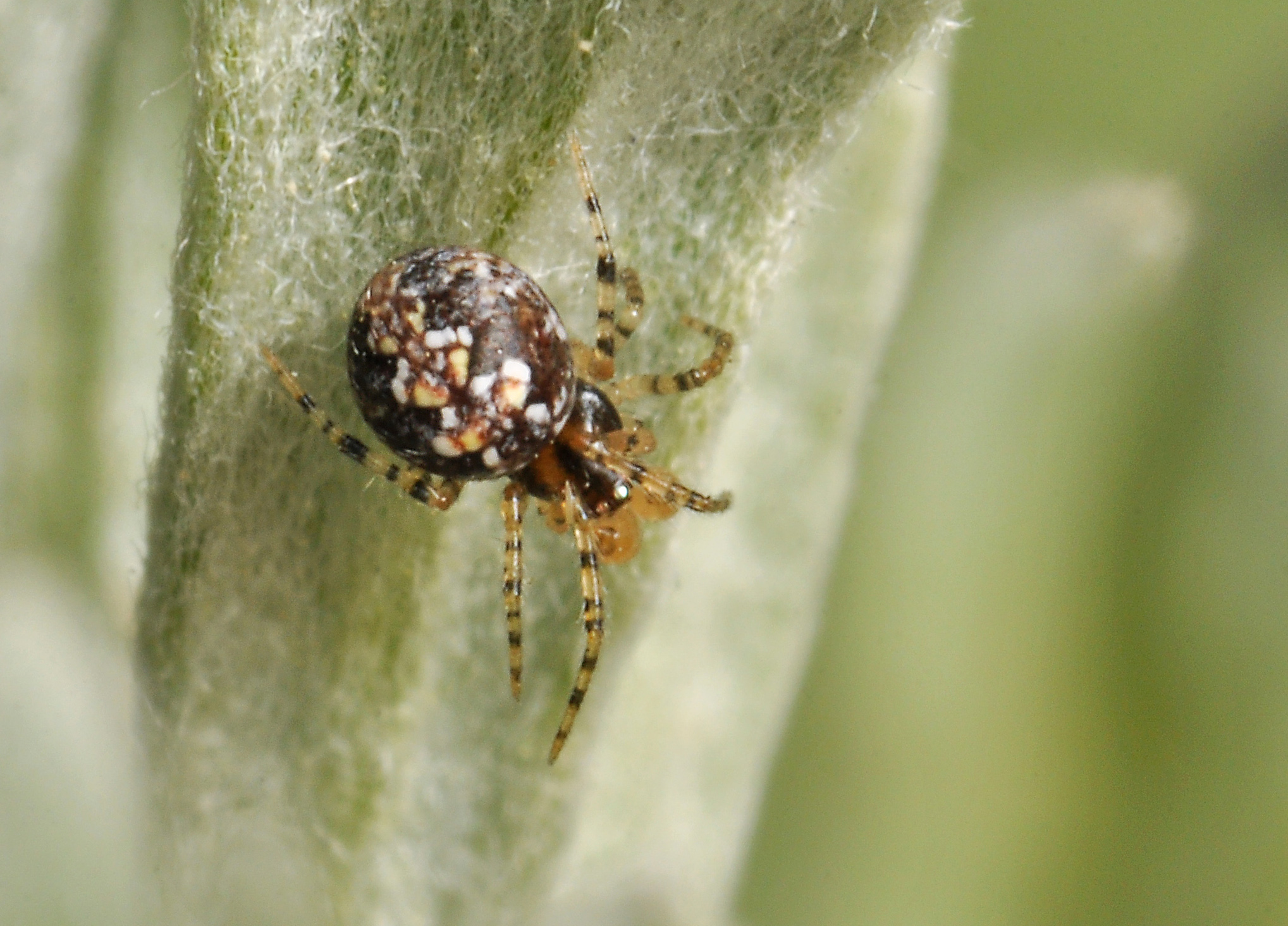

Scientific classification
- Kingdom: Animalia
- Phylum: Arthropoda
- Subphylum: Chelicerata
- Class: Arachnida
- Order: Araneae
- Infraorder: Araneomorphae
- Family: Theridiidae
- Genus: Theridion
- Species: T. logan

Binomial name
- Theridion logan Levi and Patrick, 2013

= Theridion logan =

Species of spider

Theridion logan is a species of spider in the family Theridiidae. Its Latin name refers to Logan Canyon, Utah, where the species was first discovered. The spider was discovered by two Utah State University doctoral students, Stephanie Cobbold and Lori Spears, while performing research on spider communities in Logan Canyon.

== Appearance ==
Theridion logan is approximately 2 millimetres (0.079 in) long, with the female being slightly wider and longer than the male. The spider has a black and white round body, with chevron stripes on its abdomen and spots on its top. Its appearance most closely matches Theridion rabuni.

== Distribution ==
Theridion logan has been discovered in three locations, all near the city of Logan, Utah: Logan Canyon, Green Canyon, and Blacksmith Fork Canyon. Although these spots are popular recreational areas, the spider does not seem to be affected by the presence of humans. Despite the limited distribution, T. logan does not appear to be in danger of extinction.

== Ecology ==
The species is found in sagebrush and other shrubs in its distribution area. Like most Theridiidae, it spins irregular three-dimensional webs. Prey most likely is limited to small insects. The venom of T. logan is considered harmless to humans.
