= Theridion retreatense =

Retreat Theridion comb-feet spider

Scientific classification
- Kingdom: Animalia
- Phylum: Arthropoda
- Subphylum: Chelicerata
- Class: Arachnida
- Order: Araneae
- Infraorder: Araneomorphae
- Family: Theridiidae
- Genus: Theridion
- Species: T. retreatense

Binomial name
- Theridion retreatense Strand, 1909

Species of spider

Theridion retreatense is a species of spider in the family Theridiidae. It is endemic to South Africa and is commonly known as the Retreat Theridion comb-feet spider.

== Distribution ==
Theridion retreatense is only known from the Western Cape at Fish Hoek and Cape Retreat Flats in South Africa.

== Habitat and ecology ==
It has been sampled from the Fynbos biome at altitudes ranging from 37 to 185 m.

== Description ==
Theridion retreatense is known from both sexes with a total length of 2 mm. The dark tips of the tarsi are distinct. The species resembles members of the Mimetidae family.

== Conservation ==
Theridion retreatense is listed as Data Deficient by the South African National Biodiversity Institute. The species is known only from the type localities with a very small range. The status of the species remains obscure. More sampling is needed to determine the species range.

== Taxonomy ==
Theridion retreatense was described by Embrik Strand in 1909 from Fish Hoek and Retreat Flats in the Western Cape. The species has not been revised. It is known from both sexes but has not been illustrated.
