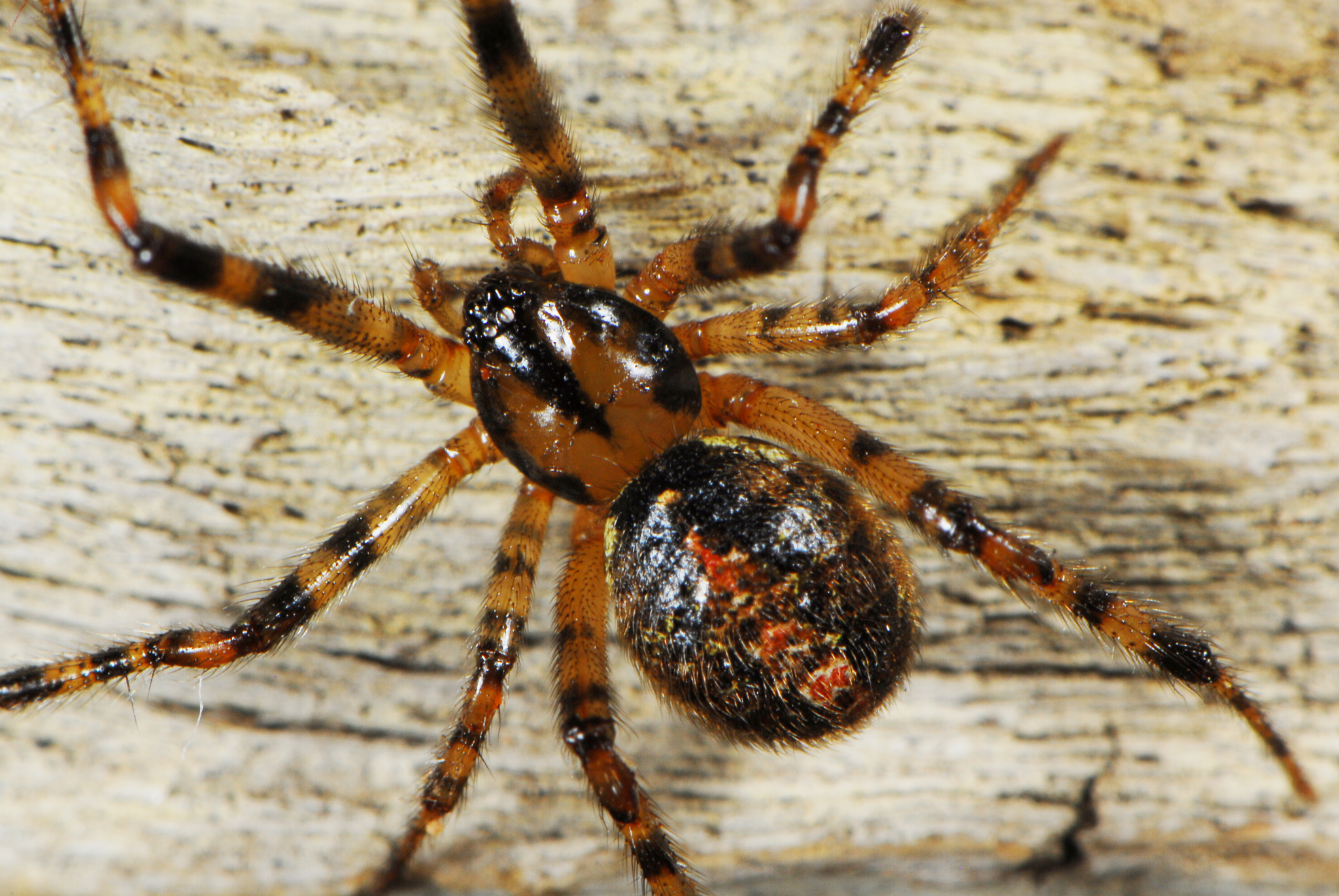
- Female
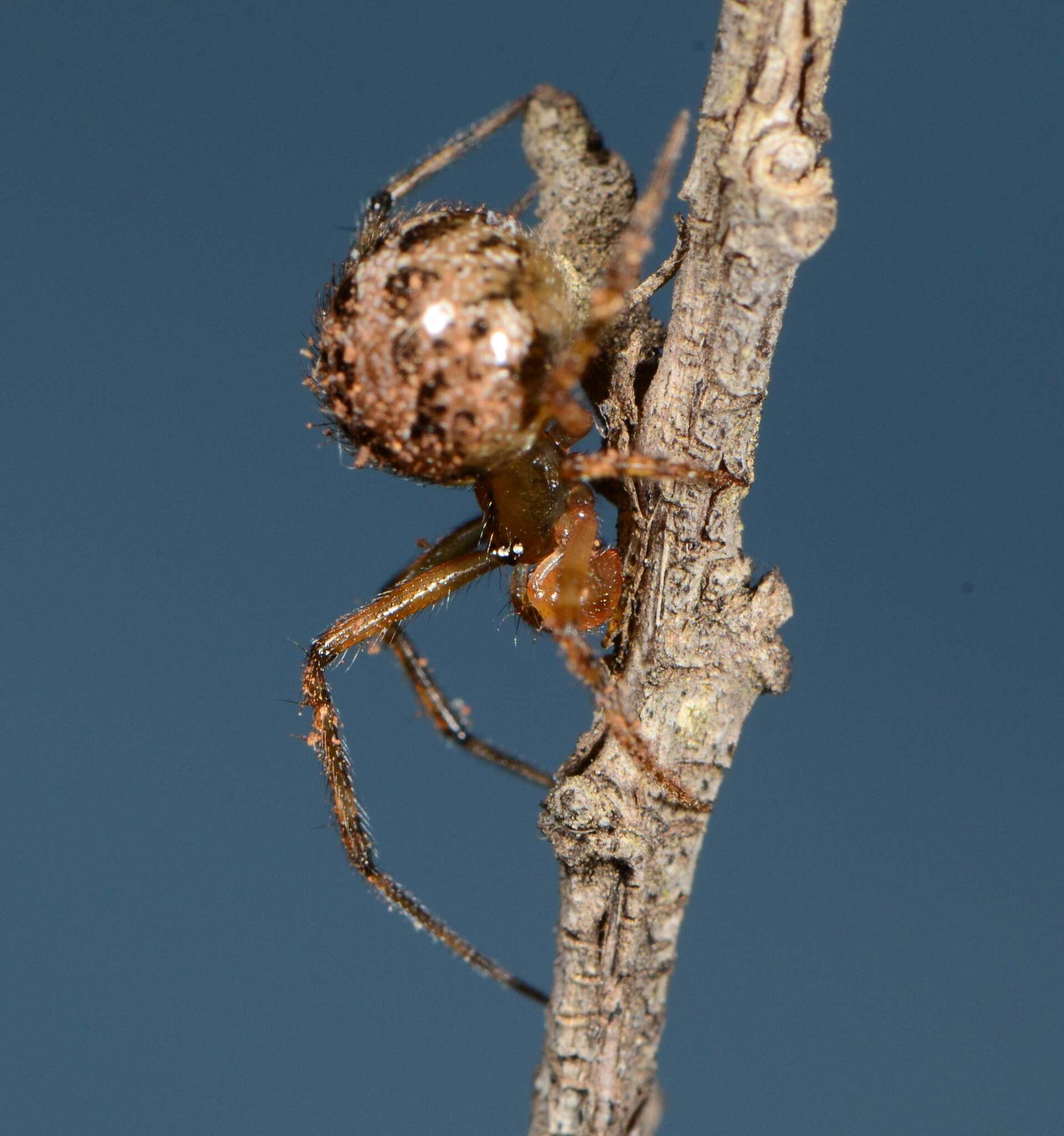
- Juvenile male

Scientific classification
- Kingdom: Animalia
- Phylum: Arthropoda
- Subphylum: Chelicerata
- Class: Arachnida
- Order: Araneae
- Infraorder: Araneomorphae
- Family: Theridiidae
- Genus: Theridion
- Species: T. purcelli

Binomial name
- Theridion purcelli O. Pickard-Cambridge, 1904

Synonyms
- Theridion purcellii O. Pickard-Cambridge, 1904

= Theridion purcelli =

Purcell's Theridion comb-feet spider

Species of spider

Theridion purcelli is a species of spider in the family Theridiidae. It is found in Saint Helena, Namibia, and South Africa, and is commonly known as Purcell's Theridion comb-feet spider.

== Distribution ==
Theridion purcelli is found in Saint Helena, Namibia, and South Africa. In South Africa it is known from all provinces.

== Habitat and ecology ==
This species builds a conical retreat of twigs and leaves in its three-dimensional labyrinth web.

It has been sampled from all the floral biomes except the Indian Ocean Coastal Belt Forest and Succulent Karoo biomes at altitudes ranging from 5 to 1809 m. The species is also commonly found in crops including citrus, cotton, macadamia, maize, strawberries, sunflowers and tomatoes. It is also synantropic and found in and around houses.

== Description ==
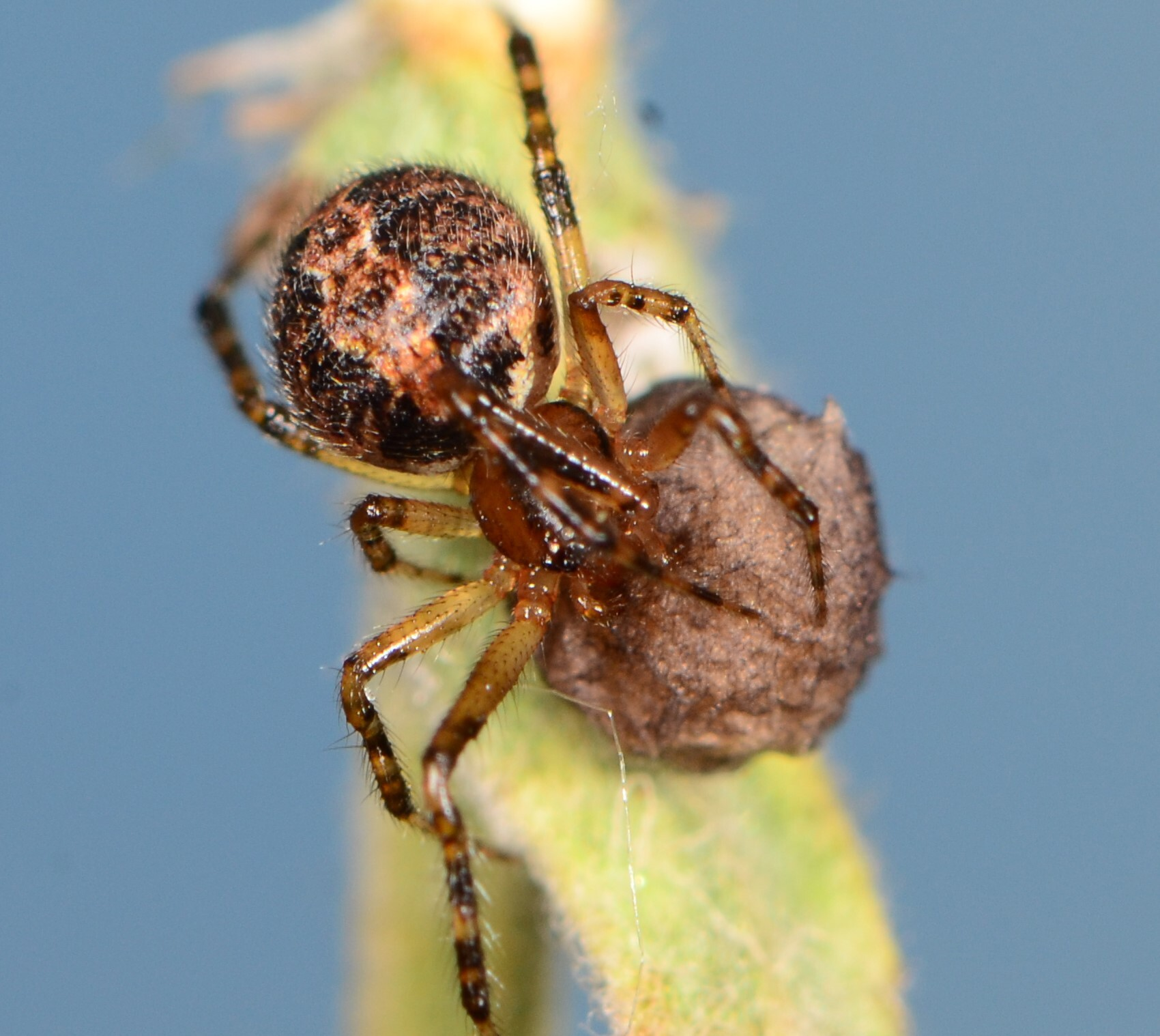
female with egg sac

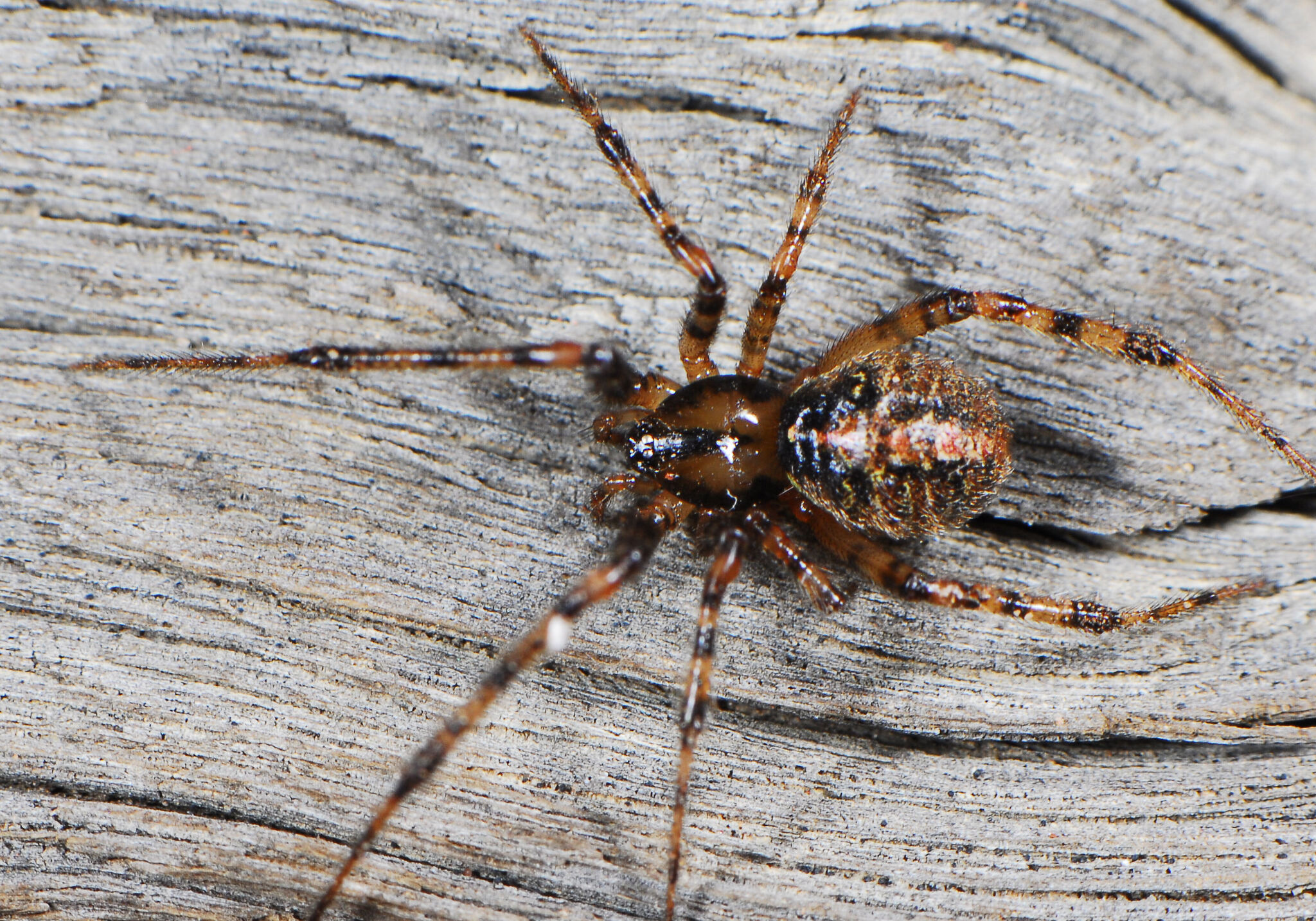
female

The abdomen is subglobular and furnished with bristly setae. The colour is dull yellowish with a longitudinal central sharply dentated band, obtuse anteriorly and tapering towards the spinnerets. The band is marked with pale spots. Ventrally the abdomen is black-brown with a central white patch. The female resembles the male.

== Conservation ==
Theridion purcelli is listed as Least Concern by the South African National Biodiversity Institute due to its large geographical range. The species is protected in six reserves.

== Etymology ==
The species is named after William Frederick Purcell, a South African naturalist and museum curator who made significant contributions to the study of southern African arachnids.

== Taxonomy ==
Theridion purcelli was described by Octavius Pickard-Cambridge in 1904 from Salt River in the Western Cape. The species has not been revised and is known from both sexes.
