= Theridion modestum =

Scientific classification
- Kingdom: Animalia
- Phylum: Arthropoda
- Subphylum: Chelicerata
- Class: Arachnida
- Order: Araneae
- Infraorder: Araneomorphae
- Family: Theridiidae
- Genus: Theridion
- Species: T. modestum

Binomial name
- Theridion modestum (Simon, 1894)

Species of spider

Theridion modestum, is a species of spider of the genus Theridion. It is endemic to Sri Lanka.
