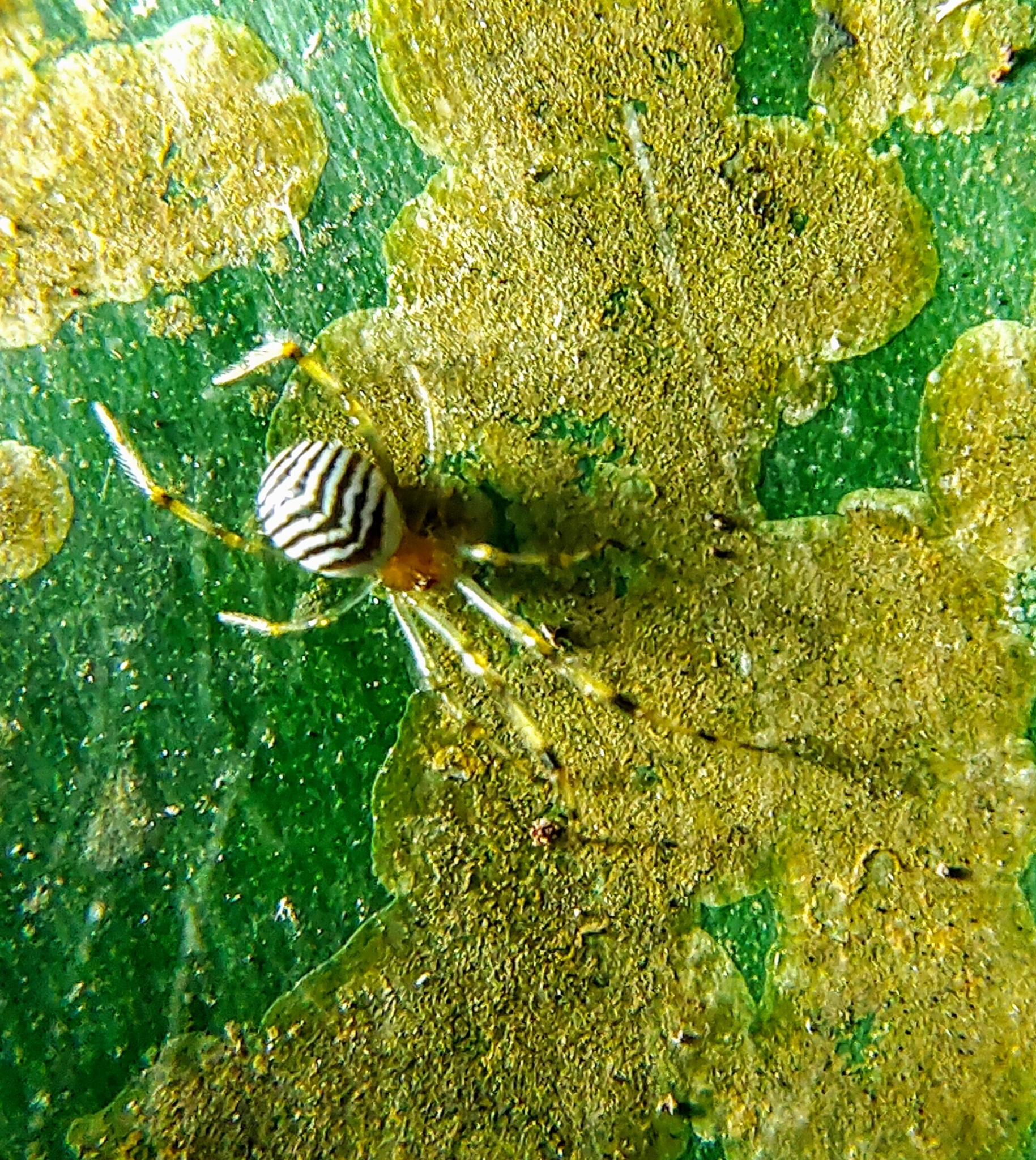
- T. zonulatum from Singapore

Scientific classification
- Kingdom: Animalia
- Phylum: Arthropoda
- Subphylum: Chelicerata
- Class: Arachnida
- Order: Araneae
- Infraorder: Araneomorphae
- Family: Theridiidae
- Genus: Theridion
- Species: T. zonulatum

Binomial name
- Theridion zonulatum Thorell, 1890

Synonyms
- Theridion zebrinusum Zhu, 1998; Theridion echinatum Gao & Li, 2014

= Theridion zonulatum =

Species of spider

Theridion zonulatum is a species of comb-footed spider in the family Theridiidae. It was first described by Tamerlan Thorell in 1890. The species is distributed across several countries in Asia, including India, China, Thailand, Singapore, and Indonesia.

== Taxonomy ==
The species has a complex taxonomic history with two junior synonyms. Theridion zebrinusum was described by Zhu in 1998, but was later determined to be the same species as T. zonulatum by Ehrler and colleagues in 2014. Similarly, Theridion echinatum, described by Gao and Li in 2014 from male specimens collected in China's Yunnan Province, was also found to be synonymous with T. zonulatum by Sankaran and colleagues in 2015.

== Distribution ==
T. zonulatum has been recorded from India, China, Thailand, Singapore, and Indonesia (including Sumatra and Borneo). In India, the species has been documented from Kerala state, specifically in the districts of Ernakulam (Malayatoor), Kollam (Kulathupuzha), Thrissur (Vazhachal), and Thiruvananthapuram (Ponmudi). The Indian records represent the first confirmed occurrence of the species in that country.

== Description ==
Like related species, Theridion zonulatum shows clear sexual dimorphism in size, with females being notably larger than males.

Females have a body length ranging from 3.30 to 4.01 mm, with the abdomen displaying distinctive black coloration marked by transverse white bands that create a zebra-like banding pattern both dorsally and laterally. The legs show dark annulations (ring-like markings). The cephalothorax measures approximately 1.02 mm in length and 1.04 mm in width, while the abdomen is about 2.31 mm long and 1.57 mm wide.

Males are considerably smaller, with body lengths ranging from 2.17 to 2.28 mm. They share similar coloration patterns with the females, including the characteristic transverse striping on the abdomen and annulated legs.

== Web architecture ==
Theridion zonulatum constructs a distinctive and complex web structure known as a "gumfoot-sheet web," which is built across the surface of green leaves. This web represents a combination of two different theridioid web types: Type 3 (Theridion-type) and Type 4 (Coleosoma-type) webs, both of which typically lack gumfoots in other species, though T. zonulatum incorporates gumfoot elements.

The web architecture consists of three distinct layers. The upper layer forms a flat "roof" constructed from unequally spaced, parallel frame-lines that serve as supporting structures, interconnected by viscid (sticky) lines arranged in a zigzag pattern. The middle layer features an expanded, bowl-shaped sheet with a knock-down trap mechanism. The lower layer contains irregularly scattered gumfoots attached to the leaf surface.

The size and complexity of the web structure depends on the dimensions of the selected leaf, with larger leaves accommodating more supporting structures and consequently larger sheet components. The spider maintains a gumfoot-free median area along the sheet to facilitate its movement within the web.
