= Theridion cruciferum =

Conservation status
- Data Deficit (NZ TCS)

Scientific classification
- Kingdom: Animalia
- Phylum: Arthropoda
- Subphylum: Chelicerata
- Class: Arachnida
- Order: Araneae
- Infraorder: Araneomorphae
- Family: Theridiidae
- Genus: Theridion
- Species: T. cruciferum

Binomial name
- Theridion cruciferum Urquhart, 1886

Synonyms
- Theridium maculopes; Theridium helvolum; Theridium exornatum; Theridium brunnea-folium; Theridium niger-punctillum; Theridium apiatum; Theridium literatum

Species of spider

Theridion cruciferum is a species of Theridiidae that is endemic to New Zealand.

== Taxonomy ==
This species was described in 1886 by Arthur Urquhart from female and male specimens.

== Description ==
The female is recorded at 5mm in length whereas the male is 4mm.

== Distribution ==
This species is known from Auckland, New Zealand.

== Conservation status ==
Under the New Zealand Threat Classification System, this species is listed as "Data Deficient" with the qualifiers of "Data Poor: Size" and "Data Poor: Trend".
