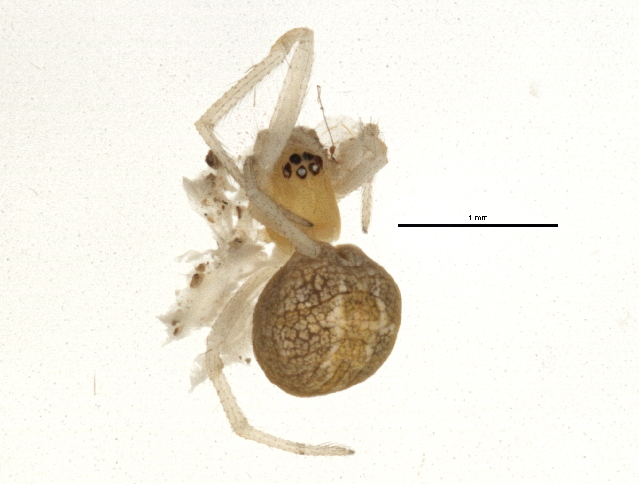
- T. submissum, immature

Scientific classification
- Kingdom: Animalia
- Phylum: Arthropoda
- Subphylum: Chelicerata
- Class: Arachnida
- Order: Araneae
- Infraorder: Araneomorphae
- Family: Theridiidae
- Genus: Theridion
- Species: T. submissum

Binomial name
- Theridion submissum Gertsch & Davis, 1936

= Theridion submissum =

Species of spider

Theridion submissum is a species of cobweb spider belonging to the Theridiidae family. It is found in the United States, Mexico, Bahama Islands, and Jamaica.
