= Theridion cuspulatum =

Scientific classification
- Kingdom: Animalia
- Phylum: Arthropoda
- Subphylum: Chelicerata
- Class: Arachnida
- Order: Araneae
- Infraorder: Araneomorphae
- Family: Theridiidae
- Genus: Theridion
- Species: T. cuspulatum

Binomial name
- Theridion cuspulatum Schmidt & Krause, 1998

Species of spider

Theridion cuspulatum is a species of tangle-web spiders of the family Theridiidae. It is endemic in Cape Verde.
