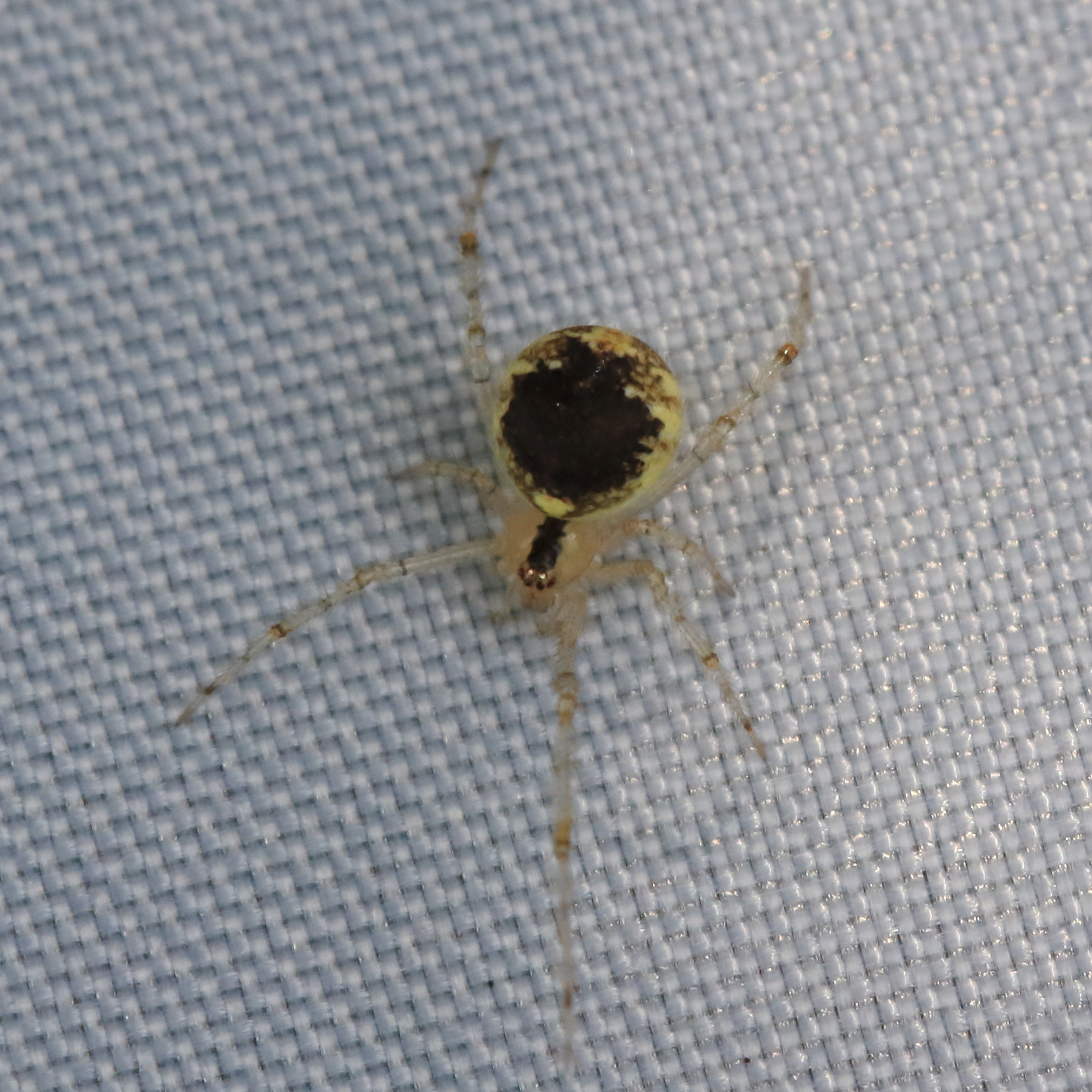

Scientific classification
- Kingdom: Animalia
- Phylum: Arthropoda
- Subphylum: Chelicerata
- Class: Arachnida
- Order: Araneae
- Infraorder: Araneomorphae
- Family: Theridiidae
- Genus: Theridion
- Species: T. varians

Binomial name
- Theridion varians Hahn, 1833

= Theridion varians =

Species of spider

Theridion varians is a species of cobweb spider in the family Theridiidae. It is found in North America, Europe, North Africa, Turkey, Caucasus, a range from Russia (Europe to Siberia), Central Asia, and China.

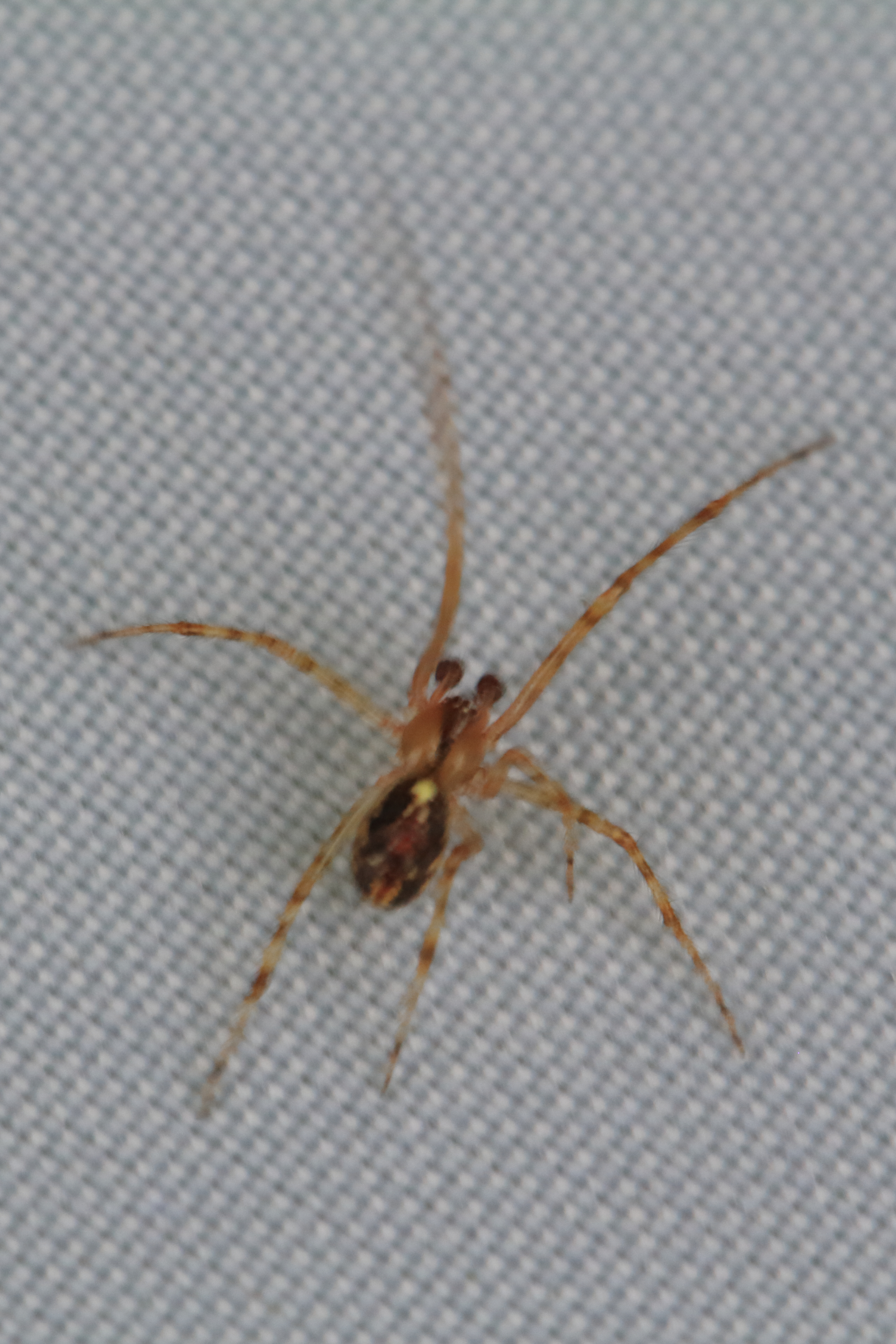

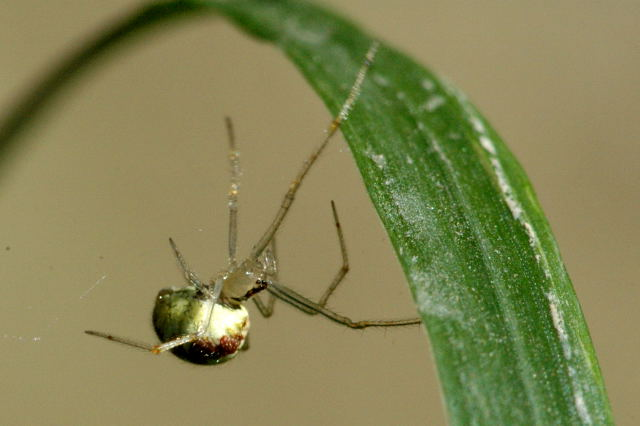

== Subspecies ==
These four subspecies belong to the species Theridion varians:

- (Theridion varians melanotum) Strand, 1907
- (Theridion varians varians) Hahn, 1833
- Theridion varians cyrenaicum Caporiacco, 1933
- Theridion varians rusticum Simon, 1873
