= Theridion michelbacheri =

Scientific classification
- Kingdom: Animalia
- Phylum: Arthropoda
- Subphylum: Chelicerata
- Class: Arachnida
- Order: Araneae
- Infraorder: Araneomorphae
- Family: Theridiidae
- Genus: Theridion
- Species: T. michelbacheri

Binomial name
- Theridion michelbacheri Levi, 1957

Species of spider

Theridion michelbacheri is a species of cobweb spider in the family Theridiidae. It is found in the United States.
