= Theridion teliferum =

Scientific classification
- Kingdom: Animalia
- Phylum: Arthropoda
- Subphylum: Chelicerata
- Class: Arachnida
- Order: Araneae
- Infraorder: Araneomorphae
- Family: Theridiidae
- Genus: Theridion
- Species: T. teliferum

Binomial name
- Theridion teliferum Simon, 1895

Species of spider

Theridion teliferum, is a species of spider of the genus Theridion. It is endemic to Sri Lanka.
