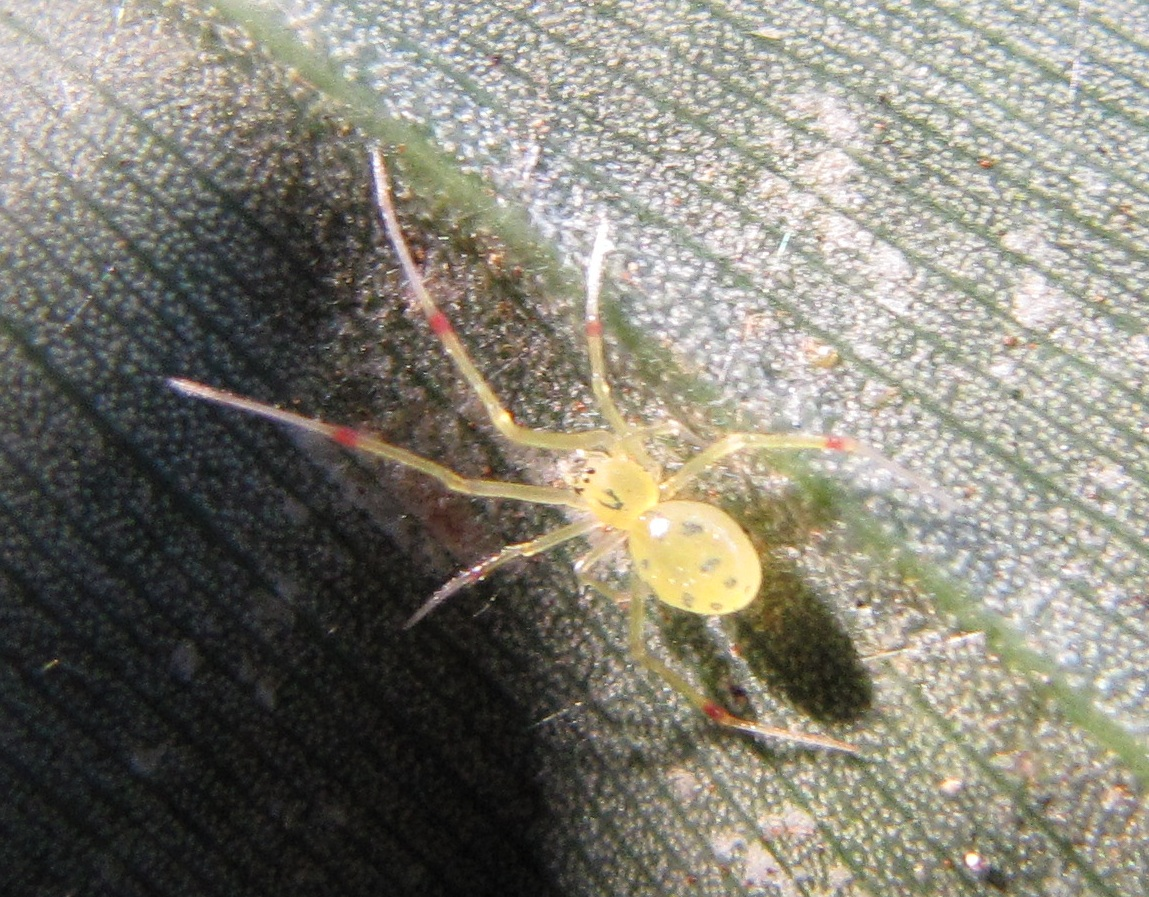
- male T. grallator
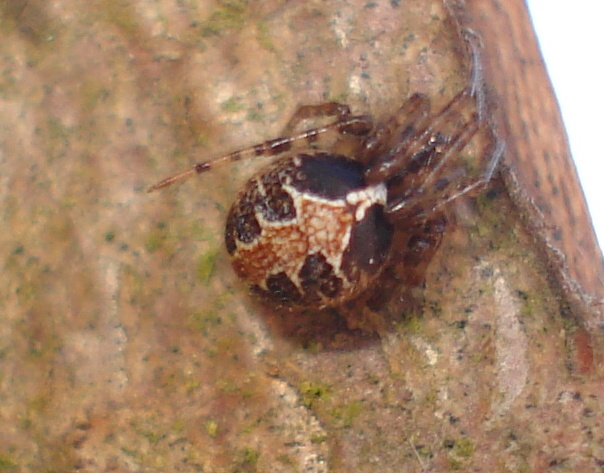
- T. pictum

Scientific classification
- Kingdom: Animalia
- Phylum: Arthropoda
- Subphylum: Chelicerata
- Class: Arachnida
- Order: Araneae
- Infraorder: Araneomorphae
- Family: Theridiidae
- Genus: Theridion; Walckenaer, 1805

Type species
- Aranea picta Walckenaer, 1802

Species
- T. attritum T. grallator T. nigroannulatum T. strepitus hundreds more, see text.

Diversity
- nearly 600 species

Synonyms
- Allotheridion; Billima; Liger; Phaetoticus

= Theridion =

Theridion Temporal range: Cretaceous–present

Genus of spiders

Theridion is a genus of tangle-web spiders with a worldwide distribution. Notable species are the Hawaiian happy face spider (T. grallator), named for the iconic symbol on its abdomen, and T. nigroannulatum, one of few spider species that lives in social groups, attacking prey en masse to overwhelm them as a team.

== Identification ==
Spiders in this genus are about as long or longer than they are wide. Their chelicerae have two or less teeth on the front edge and none on the back edge. The front leg is the longest in both genders, but the next longest is the second leg in males and the fourth leg in females. The epigyne can vary, but the pedipalp has a median apophysis and a colulus is absent from both genders. In several species, the males have mastidia (projections) on the chelicerae.

Theridion has the anterior eye row slightly curved and with a gap between it and the posterior eye row. This distinguishes it from Enoplognatha, another theridiid genus in which the anterior eye row is almost straight and the gap between eye rows is very small.

== Ecology ==
Theridion build tangle webs, usually under leaves and among vegetation. At night, spiders hang upside-down in these webs. During the day, they hide close by their webs.

Philodromus cespitum, a species of running crab spider, preys on Theridion spiders in European fruit orchards.

== Mating ==
Mating behaviour has been studied in several Theridion species. It involves pseudocopulation, numerous sperm inductions and copulatory sequences. The male approaches the female to mate, usually in the latter's retreat (a hood-shaped part of the web where the female lives in). Male Theridion perform contralateral insertions, inserting their left palp into the female's right introductory duct and vice versa for the right palp. Female Theridion are less aggressive after mating compared to other genera of theridiids.

== Species ==
As of October 2025, this genus includes 572 species and three subspecies. However, the genus has traditionally been assigned species that lack a colulus and did not fit into other genera (wastebasket taxon). New species continue to be described on a regular basis.

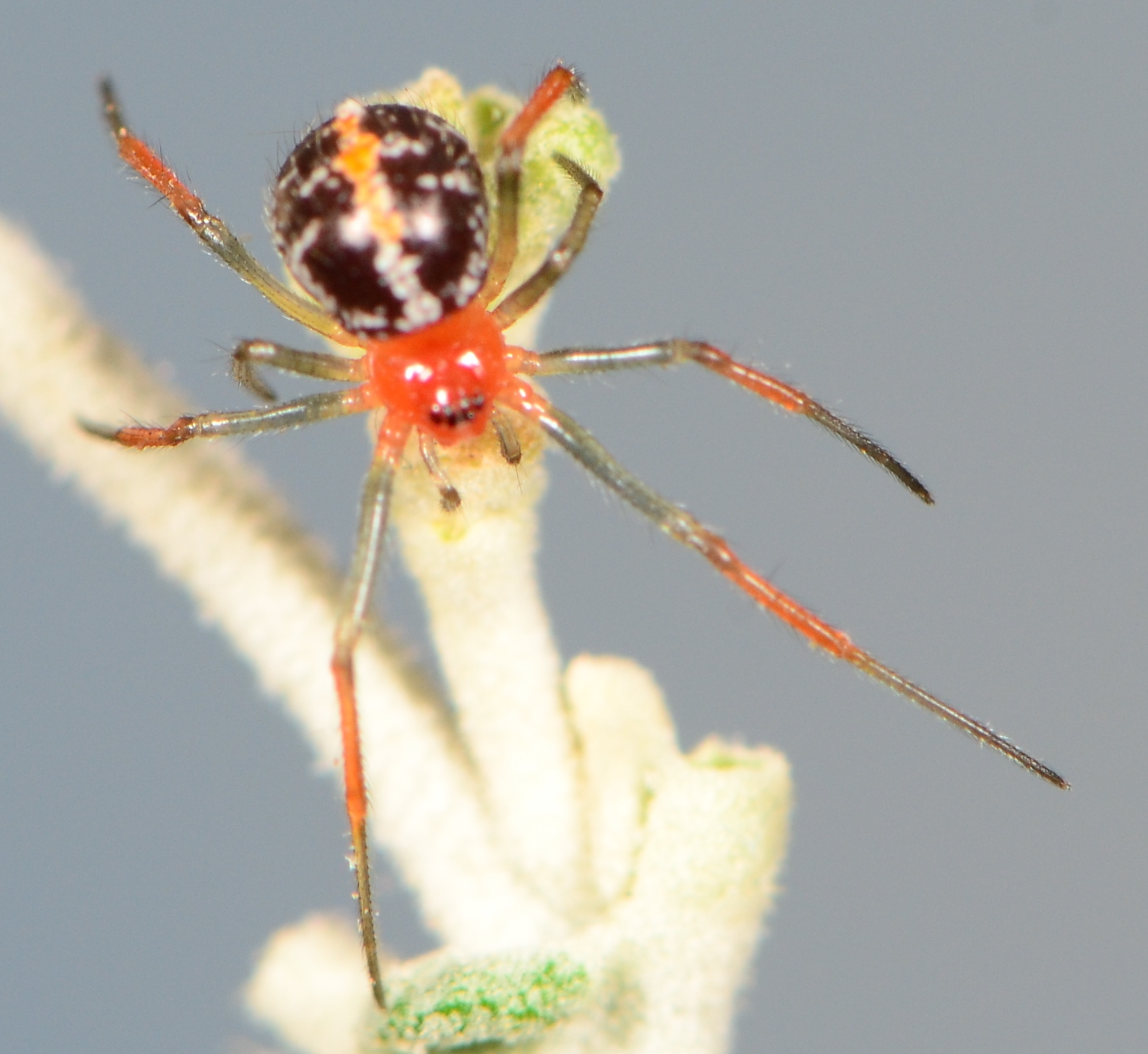
female T. delicatum

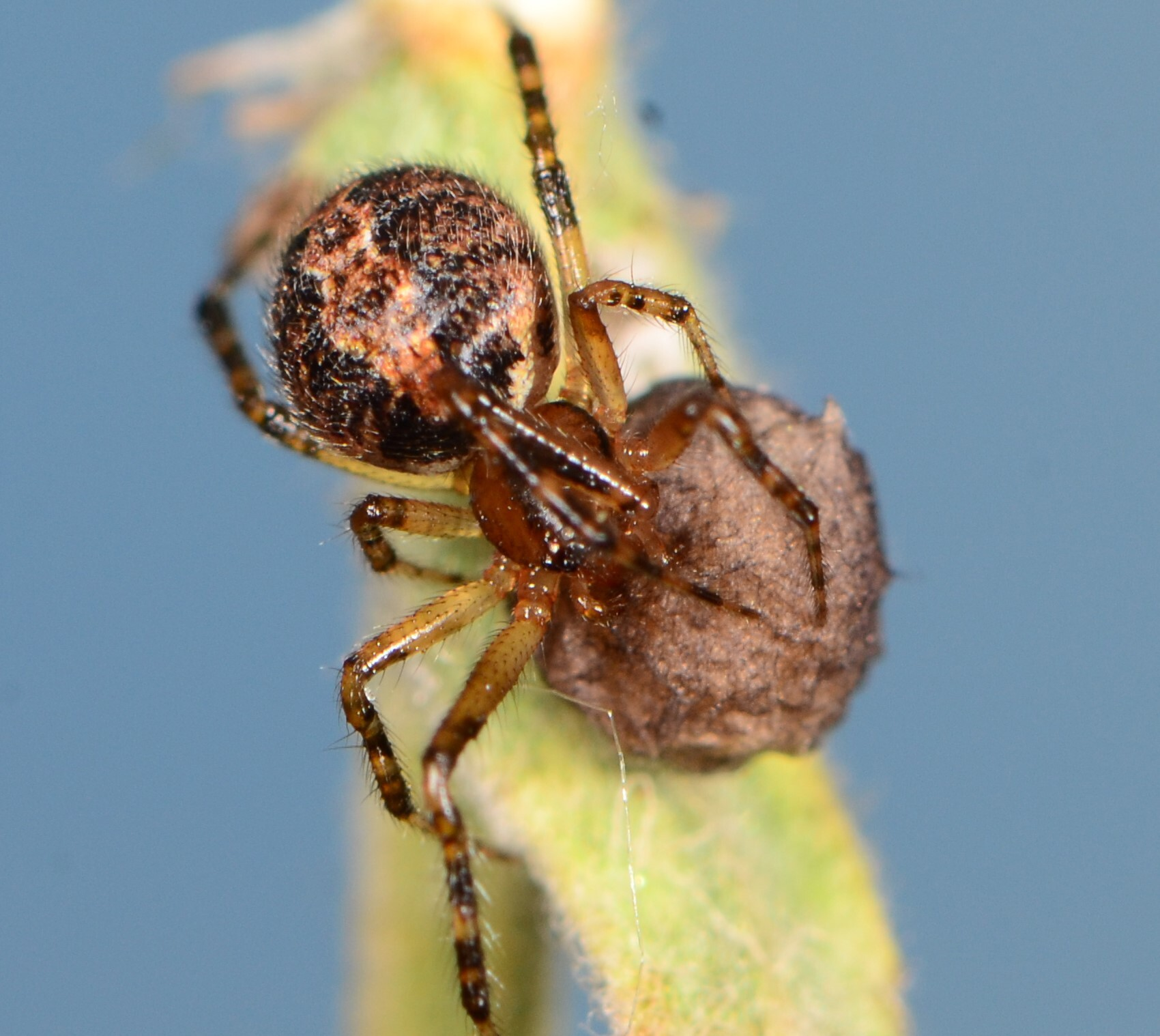
T. purcelli with egg sac

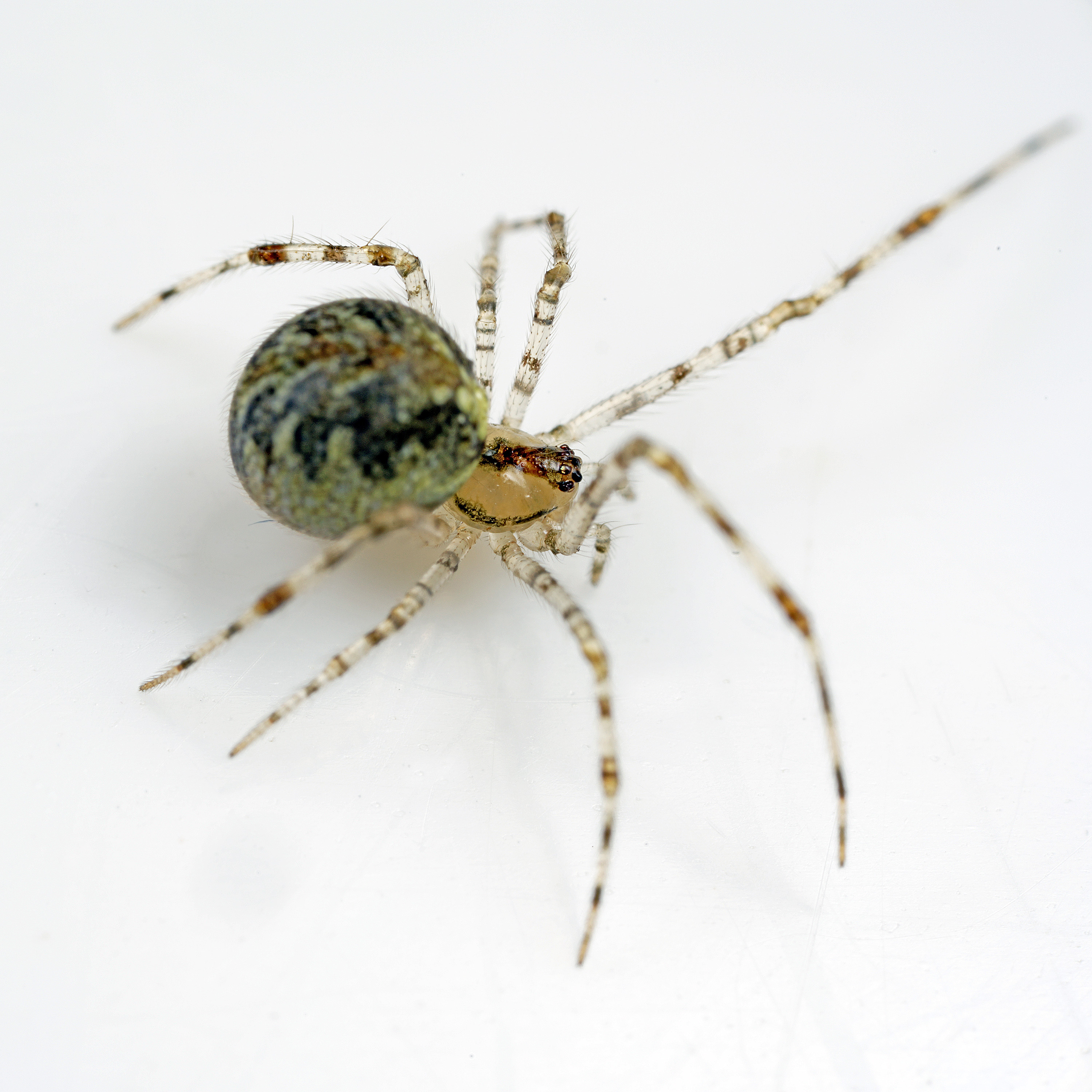
T. varians

These species have articles on Wikipedia:

- Theridion albidum Banks, 1895 – Canada, United States
- Theridion albocinctum Urquhart, 1892 – New Zealand
- Theridion albomaculosum O. Pickard-Cambridge, 1869 – Sri Lanka
- Theridion ampliatum Urquhart, 1892 – New Zealand
- Theridion argentatulum Roewer, 1942 – New Zealand
- Theridion attritum (Simon, 1908) – Australia (Western Australia)
- Theridion californicum Banks, 1904 – Canada, United States
- Theridion cheimatos Gertsch & Archer, 1942 – United States
- Theridion cruciferum Urquhart, 1886 – New Zealand
- Theridion cuspulatum Schmidt & Krause, 1998 – Cape Verde
- Theridion differens Emerton, 1882 – Canada, United States
- Theridion dilutum Levi, 1957 – United States, Mexico
- Theridion elegantissimum Roewer, 1942 – Taiwan
- Theridion flabelliferum Urquhart, 1887 – New Zealand
- Theridion flavonotatum Becker, 1879 – United States, Cuba, Turks & Caicos
- Theridion frondeum Hentz, 1850 – Canada, United States, Bahamas
- Theridion gabardi Simon, 1895 – Sri Lanka
- Theridion glaucescens Becker, 1879 – Canada, United States
- Theridion gracilipes Urquhart, 1889 – New Zealand
- Theridion grallator Simon, 1900 – Hawaii
- Theridion himalayanum Priyadarshini & Tripathy, 2026 – India (Uttarakhand)
- Theridion incertissimum (Caporiacco, 1954) – French Guiana, Brazil
- Theridion kawea Levi, 1957 – United States, Mexico
- Theridion lawrencei Gertsch & Archer, 1942 – Canada, United States
- Theridion leechi Gertsch & Archer, 1942 – Canada, United States
- Theridion llano Levi, 1957 – United States
- Theridion logan Levi & Patrick, 2013 – United States
- Theridion longicrure Marples, 1956 – New Zealand
- Theridion luteitarse Schmidt & Krause, 1995 – Cape Verde
- Theridion melanurum Hahn, 1831 – Macaronesia, North Africa, Europe, Turkey, Caucasus, Russia (Europe to Middle Siberia), Middle East. Introduced to Canada, United States
- Theridion michelbacheri Levi, 1957 – United States
- Theridion modestum (Simon, 1894) – Sri Lanka
- Theridion murarium Emerton, 1882 – Canada, United States, Mexico
- Theridion neomexicanum Banks, 1901 – Canada, United States
- Theridion neshamini Levi, 1957 – United States
- Theridion nodiferum Simon, 1895 – Sri Lanka
- Theridion pennsylvanicum Emerton, 1913 – Canada, United States
- Theridion pictum (Walckenaer, 1802) – North America, Europe, North Africa, Caucasus, Russia (Europe to Far East), Kazakhstan, Turkemenistan, China, Japan. Introduced to South Africa (type species)
- Theridion porphyreticum Urquhart, 1889 – New Zealand
- Theridion punctipes Emerton, 1924 – United States, Mexico
- Theridion punicapunctatum Urquhart, 1891 – New Zealand
- Theridion quadratum (O. Pickard-Cambridge, 1882) – Sri Lanka, Indonesia (Sumatra)
- Theridion rabuni Chamberlin & Ivie, 1944 – Canada, United States, Bahamas
- Theridion squalidum Urquhart, 1886 – New Zealand
- Theridion strepitus Peck & Shear, 1987 – Galapagos
- Theridion submissum Gertsch & Davis, 1936 – United States, Mexico, Bahama Is. Jamaica
- Theridion teliferum Simon, 1895 – Sri Lanka
- Theridion varians Hahn, 1833 – Europe, North Africa, Turkey, Caucasus, Russia (Europe to Far East), Kazakhstan, Iran, Central Asia, China. Introduced to Canada, United States
- Theridion viridanum Urquhart, 1887 – New Zealand
- Theridion zantholabio Urquhart, 1886 – New Zealand
- Theridion zonulatum Thorell, 1890 – India, China, Thailand, Singapore, Indonesia (Sumatra, Borneo)

Complete species list as of October 2025
- T. abruptum Simon, 1884 – Sudan
- T. acanthopodum Gao & Li, 2014 – China
- T. accoense Levy, 1985 – Israel
- T. acutitarse Simon, 1900 – Hawaii
- T. adjacens (O. Pickard-Cambridge, 1896) – Mexico to Panama
- T. adrianopoli Drensky, 1915 – North Macedonia, Bulgaria, Albania, Greece (incl. Crete), Turkey
- T. aeolium Levi, 1963 – United States
- T. agrarium Levi, 1963 – Brazil
- T. agreste Nicolet, 1849 – Chile
- T. agrifoliae Levi, 1957 – Canada, United States
- T. akme Levi, 1959 – Panama
- T. akron Levi, 1959 – Panama
- T. albidorsum Strand, 1909 – South Africa
- T. albidum Banks, 1895 – Canada, United States
- T. albioculum Zhu, 1998 – China
- T. albipes L. Koch, 1878 – Caucasus (Russia, Georgia)
- T. albocinctum Urquhart, 1892 – New Zealand
- T. albodecoratum Rainbow, 1916 – Australia (Queensland)
- T. albolineatum Nicolet, 1849 – Chile
- T. albolineolatum Caporiacco, 1940 – Ethiopia
- T. albomaculosum O. Pickard-Cambridge, 1869 – Sri Lanka
- T. albopictum Thorell, 1898 – Myanmar
- T. albostriatum (L. Koch, 1867) – New Guinea, Australia (Queensland, Norfolk Is.), Tonga
- T. albulum O. Pickard-Cambridge, 1898 – Panama
- T. amarga Levi, 1967 – Chile, Argentina
- T. amatitlan Levi, 1963 – Guatemala
- T. ambiguum Nicolet, 1849 – Chile
- T. ampascachi Mello-Leitão, 1941 – Argentina
- T. ampliatum Urquhart, 1892 – New Zealand
- T. angusticeps Caporiacco, 1949 – Kenya
- T. angustifrons Caporiacco, 1934 – Pakistan
- T. anson Levi, 1967 – Chile (Juan Fernandez Is.)
- T. antillanum Simon, 1894 – Caribbean
- T. apiculatum Roewer, 1942 – Australia (Queensland)
- T. aporum Levi, 1963 – Brazil
- T. apostoli Mello-Leitão, 1945 – Argentina
- T. apulco Levi, 1959 – Mexico
- T. aragua Levi, 1963 – Venezuela
- T. archeri Levi, 1959 – Cuba
- T. argentatulum Roewer, 1942 – New Zealand
- T. ariel Bellvert & Arnedo, 2021 – Hawaii
- T. arizonense Levi, 1957 – United States
- T. arsia Zamani & Marusik, 2021 – Iran, Kazakhstan
- T. artum Levi, 1959 – Panama, Trinidad
- T. aruanum Strand, 1911 – Indonesia (Aru Is.)
- T. arushae Caporiacco, 1947 – Tanzania
- T. asbolodes Rainbow, 1917 – Australia (South Australia)
- T. asopi Vanuytven, 2014 – Western and Central Europe, Italy
- T. astrigerum Thorell, 1895 – Myanmar
- T. atratum Thorell, 1877 – Indonesia (Sulawesi)
- T. attritum (Simon, 1908) – Australia (Western Australia)
- T. auberti Simon, 1904 – South Africa
- T. aulos Levi, 1963 – Brazil
- T. australe Banks, 1899 – United States, Mexico, Caribbean
- T. baccula Thorell, 1887 – Myanmar
- T. baltasarense Levi, 1963 – Windward Is.
- T. banksi Berland, 1920 – East Africa
- T. barbarae Levi, 1959 – Mexico
- T. beebei Levi, 1963 – Venezuela
- T. bellatulum Levi, 1963 – Brazil
- T. bengalense Sen, Saha & Raychaudhuri, 2011 – India
- T. bergi Levi, 1963 – Brazil, Paraguay, Argentina
- T. berlandi Roewer, 1942 – Samoa
- T. bernardi Lecigne, 2017 – Portugal
- T. betteni Wiehle, 1960 – Europe, Turkey
- T. bicruciatum Roewer, 1961 – Senegal, Mozambique, South Africa, Eswatini
- T. bidepressum Yin, Peng & Zhang, 2005 – China
- T. biezankoi Levi, 1963 – Brazil
- T. biforaminum Gao & Zhu, 1993 – China
- T. biolleyi Banks, 1909 – Costa Rica
- T. biseriatum Thorell, 1890 – Indonesia (Sumatra)
- T. bisignatum (Mello-Leitão, 1945) – Brazil, Argentina
- T. bitakum Barrion & Litsinger, 1995 – Philippines
- T. blaisei Simon, 1909 – Vietnam
- T. boesenbergi Strand, 1904 – Europe, Caucasus
- T. bolivari Levi, 1959 – Mexico
- T. bolum Levi, 1963 – Brazil
- T. bomae Schmidt, 1957 – DR Congo
- T. bosniense Wunderlich, 2011 – Bosnia and Herzegovina
- T. botanicum Levi, 1963 – Venezuela
- T. brachypus Thorell, 1887 – Myanmar
- T. bradyanum Strand, 1907 – South Africa
- T. brunellii Caporiacco, 1940 – Ethiopia
- T. brunneonigrum Caporiacco, 1949 – Kenya
- T. bryantae Roewer, 1951 – Mexico
- T. bullatum Tullgren, 1910 – Tanzania
- T. buxtoni Berland, 1929 – Samoa, French Polynesia (Society Is., Tuamotu Arch.), Pitcairn Is. (Henderson Is.)
- T. cairoense Wunderlich, 2011 – Egypt
- T. calcynatum Holmberg, 1876 – Venezuela to Argentina
- T. caliban Bellvert & Arnedo, 2021 – Hawaii
- T. californicum Banks, 1904 – Canada, United States
- T. caliginosum Marples, 1955 – Samoa
- T. cameronense Levi, 1957 – United States, Mexico
- T. carinatum Yin, Peng & Zhang, 2005 – China
- T. carpathium Brignoli, 1984 – Greece
- T. cassinicola Simon, 1907 – Guinea-Bissau
- T. castaneum Franganillo, 1931 – Cuba
- T. catharina Marples, 1955 – Samoa
- T. cavipalpus (F. O. Pickard-Cambridge, 1902) – Guatemala
- T. cazieri Levi, 1959 – Bahama Is.
- T. centrum Levi, 1959 – Panama
- T. ceres Bellvert & Arnedo, 2021 – Hawaii
- T. ceylonicum Dunlop & Jekel, 2009 – Sri Lanka
- T. chacoense Levi, 1963 – Bolivia
- T. chakinuense Wunderlich, 1995 – Turkmenistan
- T. chamberlini Caporiacco, 1949 – Kenya
- T. charitonowi Caporiacco, 1949 – Kenya
- T. charlati Dierkens, 2016 – French Polynesia (Society Is.: Tahiti)
- T. cheimatos Gertsch & Archer, 1942 – United States
- T. cheni Zhu, 1998 – China
- T. chenzhangfui Lin & Li, 2024 – China
- T. chihuahua Levi, 1959 – Mexico
- T. chiriqui Levi, 1959 – Panama
- T. choroni Levi, 1963 – Venezuela
- T. cinctipes Banks, 1898 – United States, Mexico
- T. cinereum Thorell, 1875 – Switzerland and Italy to Ukraine and Turkey, Caucasus, Russia, (Europe), Iran
- T. circuitum Gao & Li, 2014 – China
- T. circumtextum Simon, 1907 – Guinea-Bissau
- T. climacode Thorell, 1898 – Myanmar
- T. clivalum Zhu, 1998 – China
- T. cloxum Roberts, 1983 – Seychelles (Aldabra)
- T. clypeatellum Tullgren, 1910 – Ethiopia, Kenya, Tanzania
- T. cochise Levi, 1963 – United States
- T. cochrum Levi, 1963 – Brazil
- T. cocosense Strand, 1906 – Costa Rica (Cocos Is.)
- T. coenosum Thorell, 1887 – Myanmar
- T. cohni Levi, 1963 – Brazil
- T. coldeniae Baert & Maelfait, 1986 – Galapagos
- T. comstocki Berland, 1920 – Kenya
- T. confusum O. Pickard-Cambridge, 1885 – Pakistan
- T. contreras Levi, 1959 – Mexico
- T. convexellum Roewer, 1942 – Australia (Queensland, New South Wales)
- T. convexisternum Caporiacco, 1949 – Kenya
- T. corcyraeum Brignoli, 1984 – Greece (Corfu, Crete)
- T. costaricaense Levi, 1963 – Costa Rica to Venezuela
- T. cowlesae Levi, 1957 – United States
- T. coyoacan Levi, 1959 – Mexico
- T. cruciferum Urquhart, 1886 – New Zealand
- T. crucum Levi, 1959 – Mexico
- T. cuspulatum Schmidt & Krause, 1998 – Cape Verde
- T. cuyutlan Levi, 1963 – Mexico
- T. cygneum Gao & Li, 2014 – China
- T. cynicum Gertsch & Mulaik, 1936 – United States, Mexico
- T. cyprusense Wunderlich, 2011 – Cyprus, Iran
- T. dafnense Levy & Amitai, 1982 – Israel
- T. davisorum Levi, 1959 – Mexico
- T. dayongense Zhu, 1998 – China
- T. decemmaculatum Thorell, 1890 – Indonesia (Sumatra)
- T. decemperlatum (Simon, 1889) – Madagascar
- T. dedux O. Pickard-Cambridge, 1904 – South Africa
- T. delicatum O. Pickard-Cambridge, 1904 – Zimbabwe, South Africa
- T. derhami Simon, 1895 – Sierra Leone, Gabon, Equatorial Guinea (Bioko)
- T. desertum Ponomarev, 2008 – Kazakhstan
- T. diadematum Chrysanthus, 1963 – New Guinea
- T. dianiphum Rainbow, 1916 – Australia (Queensland)
- T. differens Emerton, 1882 – Canada, United States
- T. dilucidum Simon, 1898 – Costa Rica to Venezuela, Caribbean
- T. dilutum Levi, 1957 – United States, Mexico
- T. dividuum Gertsch & Archer, 1942 – United States
- T. dominica Levi, 1963 – Dominican Rep.
- T. dreisbachi Levi, 1959 – Mexico
- T. dubium Bradley, 1877 – New Guinea
- T. dukouense Zhu, 1998 – China
- T. dulcineum Gertsch & Archer, 1942 – United States
- T. durbanicum Lawrence, 1947 – South Africa
- T. ecuadorense Levi, 1963 – Ecuador
- T. electum (O. Pickard-Cambridge, 1896) – Mexico
- T. elegantissimum Roewer, 1942 – Taiwan
- T. elevatum Thorell, 1881 – Australia (Queensland)
- T. elisabethae Roewer, 1951 – Mexico
- T. elli Sedgwick, 1974 – Chile
- T. ellicottense Dobyns & Bond, 1996 – United States
- T. emertoni Berland, 1920 – Kenya
- T. epiense Berland, 1938 – Vanuatu
- T. eremum Levi, 1963 – Brazil
- T. eugeni Roewer, 1942 – Equatorial Guinea (Bioko)
- T. evexum Keyserling, 1884 – Mexico, Caribbean to Brazil
- T. excavatum F. O. Pickard-Cambridge, 1902 – Guatemala
- T. exlineae Levi, 1963 – Ecuador, Peru
- T. expallidatum O. Pickard-Cambridge, 1885 – Pakistan, India
- T. falcatum Gao & Li, 2014 – China
- T. familiare O. Pickard-Cambridge, 1871 – Europe, Caucasus, China
- T. fastosum Keyserling, 1884 – Ecuador, Peru
- T. fatuhivaense Berland, 1933 – Marquesas Is.
- T. femorale Thorell, 1881 – Australia (Queensland)
- T. femoratissimum Caporiacco, 1949 – Kenya
- T. ferdinand Bellvert & Arnedo, 2021 – Hawaii
- T. fernandense Simon, 1907 – Equatorial Guinea (Bioko)
- T. filum Levi, 1963 – Brazil
- T. flabelliferum Urquhart, 1887 – New Zealand
- T. flavonotatum Becker, 1879 – United States, Cuba, Turks & Caicos
- T. flavoornatum Thorell, 1898 – Myanmar
- T. fornicatum Simon, 1884 – Sudan
- T. frio Levi, 1959 – Mexico
- T. frizzellorum Levi, 1963 – Colombia, Ecuador, Venezuela
- T. frondeum Hentz, 1850 – Canada, United States, Bahamas
- T. fruticum Simon, 1890 – Yemen
- T. furfuraceum Simon, 1914 – France, Algeria, Syria
- T. fuscodecoratum Rainbow, 1916 – Australia (Queensland)
- T. fuscomaculatum Rainbow, 1916 – Australia (Queensland)
- T. gabardi Simon, 1895 – Sri Lanka
- T. galerum Levi, 1959 – Panama
- T. gekkonicum Levy & Amitai, 1982 – Israel
- T. geminipunctum Chamberlin, 1924 – United States, Mexico
- T. genistae Simon, 1873 – Mediterranean
- T. gertschi Levi, 1959 – United States, Mexico
- T. gibbum Rainbow, 1916 – Australia (Queensland)
- T. giraulti Rainbow, 1916 – Australia (Queensland)
- T. glaciale Caporiacco, 1934 – Pakistan (Karakorum)
- T. glaucescens Becker, 1879 – Canada, United States
- T. glaucinum Simon, 1881 – Spain, France, Albania
- T. goodnightorum Levi, 1957 – United States, Mexico
- T. gracilipes Urquhart, 1889 – New Zealand
- T. grallator Simon, 1900 – Hawaii
- T. gramineum Zhu, 1998 – China
- T. grammatophorum Simon, 1909 – Vietnam
- T. grandiosum Levi, 1963 – Peru
- T. grecia Levi, 1959 – Mexico to Venezuela
- T. gyirongense Hu & Li, 1987 – China
- T. hainanense Zhu, 1998 – China (Hainan)
- T. haleakalense Simon, 1900 – Hawaii
- T. hannoniae Denis, 1945 – Europe, North Africa, Turkey, Madeira, Canary Islands
- T. harmsi Wunderlich, 2011 – Portugal, Spain, France
- T. hartmeyeri Simon, 1908 – Australia (Western Australia)
- T. hassleri Levi, 1963 – Hispaniola
- T. hebridisianum Berland, 1938 – Vanuatu
- T. helena Wunderlich, 2011 – Greece, Cyprus, Turkey
- T. helophorum Thorell, 1895 – Indonesia (Java)
- T. hemerobium Simon, 1914 – Canada, United States, Europe, Turkey, Israel, Iran
- T. hermonense Levy, 1991 – Tunisia, Israel, Iran
- T. hewitti Caporiacco, 1949 – Ethiopia
- T. hidalgo Levi, 1957 – United States, Mexico
- T. hierichonticum Levy & Amitai, 1982 – Israel
- T. himalayanum Priyadarshini & Tripathy, 2026 – India (Uttarakhand)
- T. hispidum O. Pickard-Cambridge, 1898 – Mexico, Caribbean to Paraguay
- T. histrionicum Thorell, 1875 – Italy
- T. hondurense Levi, 1959 – Honduras
- T. hopkinsi Berland, 1929 – Samoa
- T. hotanense Zhu & Zhou, 1993 – Iran, India, China
- T. huanuco Levi, 1963 – Peru
- T. hufengense Tang, Yin & Peng, 2005 – China
- T. humboldti Levi, 1967 – Peru
- T. hummeli Schenkel, 1936 – China
- T. hupingense Yin, 2012 – China
- T. idiotypum Rainbow, 1917 – Australia (South Australia)
- T. illecebrosum Simon, 1886 – Senegal
- T. impegrum Keyserling, 1886 – Brazil
- T. impressithorax Simon, 1895 – Philippines
- T. incanescens Simon, 1890 – Egypt, Yemen
- T. incertissimum (Caporiacco, 1954) – French Guiana, Brazil
- T. incertum O. Pickard-Cambridge, 1885 – Pakistan
- T. incomtum (O. Pickard-Cambridge, 1896) – Guatemala
- T. inconspicuum Thorell, 1898 – Myanmar
- T. innocuum Thorell, 1875 – Ukraine, Russia (Europe to South Siberia), Iran, Kazakhstan, China
- T. inquinatum Thorell, 1878 – Myanmar, Singapore, Indonesia (Ambon)
- T. insignitarse Simon, 1907 – Gabon
- T. intritum (Bishop & Crosby, 1926) – United States
- T. iramon Levi, 1963 – Colombia, Ecuador
- T. irrugatum Gao & Li, 2014 – China
- T. ischagosum Barrion & Litsinger, 1995 – Philippines
- T. isorium Levi, 1963 – Peru
- T. istokpoga Levi, 1957 – USA to Panama
- T. italiense Wunderlich, 1995 – Italy, North Macedonia, Romania
- T. jordanense Levy & Amitai, 1982 – Egypt, Israel, Syria
- T. juno Bellvert & Arnedo, 2021 – Hawaii
- T. kambalum Barrion & Litsinger, 1995 – Philippines
- T. karamayense Zhu, 1998 – China
- T. kauaiense Simon, 1900 – Hawaii
- T. kawea Levi, 1957 – United States, Mexico
- T. kibonotense Tullgren, 1910 – Tanzania
- T. kiliani Müller & Heimer, 1990 – Colombia
- T. kobrooricum Strand, 1911 – Indonesia (Aru Is.)
- T. kochi Roewer, 1942 – Samoa
- T. kraussi Marples, 1957 – Fiji
- T. lacticolor Berland, 1920 – Kenya, Yemen, Madagascar
- T. laevigatum Blackwall, 1870 – Italy
- T. lago Levi, 1963 – Ecuador
- T. lanceatum Zhang & Zhu, 2007 – China
- T. lapidicola Kulczyński, 1887 – Italy
- T. latisternum Caporiacco, 1934 – Pakistan
- T. lawrencei Gertsch & Archer, 1942 – Canada, United States
- T. leechi Gertsch & Archer, 1942 – Canada, United States
- T. leguiai Chamberlin, 1916 – Colombia, Peru
- T. leones Levi, 1959 – Mexico
- T. leucophaeum Simon, 1905 – India
- T. leve Blackwall, 1877 – Seychelles
- T. leviorum Gertsch & Riechert, 1976 – United States
- T. liaoyuanense (Zhu & Yu, 1982) – China
- T. limatum Tullgren, 1910 – Tanzania
- T. limitatum L. Koch, 1872 – Australia (Queensland, New South Wales)
- T. linaresense Levi, 1963 – Chile
- T. linzhiense Hu, 2001 – China
- T. llano Levi, 1957 – United States
- T. logan Levi & Patrick, 2013 – United States
- T. lomirae Roewer, 1938 – New Guinea
- T. longicrure Marples, 1956 – New Zealand
- T. longiductum Liu & Peng, 2012 – China
- T. longihirsutum Strand, 1907 – China
- T. longioembolia Liu & Peng, 2012 – China
- T. longipalpum Zhu, 1998 – China, Korea
- T. longipedatum Roewer, 1942 – Colombia
- T. longipili Seo, 2004 – Korea
- T. ludekingi Thorell, 1890 – Indonesia (Java)
- T. ludius Simon, 1880 – Malaysia to Australia, New Caledonia
- T. lumabani Barrion & Litsinger, 1995 – Philippines
- T. luteitarse Schmidt & Krause, 1995 – Cape Verde
- T. macei Simon, 1895 – DR Congo (region)
- T. machu Levi, 1963 – Peru
- T. macropora Tang, Yin & Peng, 2006 – China
- T. macuchi Levi, 1963 – Ecuador
- T. maculiferum Roewer, 1942 – Tanzania (Zanzibar)
- T. magdalenense Müller & Heimer, 1990 – Colombia
- T. maindroni Simon, 1905 – India
- T. makotoi Yoshida, 2009 – Japan
- T. malagaense Wunderlich, 2011 – Spain, Italy (Sardinia)
- T. manjithar Tikader, 1970 – India
- T. manonoense Marples, 1955 – Samoa
- T. maranum Levi, 1963 – Venezuela
- T. maron Levi, 1963 – Paraguay
- T. martini Levi, 1959 – Mexico
- T. mataafa Marples, 1955 – Samoa
- T. mauense Caporiacco, 1949 – Kenya
- T. mauiense Simon, 1900 – Hawaii
- T. mehlum Roberts, 1983 – Seychelles (Aldabra)
- T. melanoplax Schmidt & Krause, 1996 – Canary Islands
- T. melanoprorum Thorell, 1895 – Myanmar
  - T. m. orientale Simon, 1909 – Vietnam
- T. melanostictum O. Pickard-Cambridge, 1876 – Macaronesia, Mediterranean to Egypt, India, Central Asia, China, Japan. Introduced to Canada, United States, Panama, Galapagos, Poland, St. Helena, Society Is.
- T. melanurum Hahn, 1831 – Macaronesia, North Africa, Europe, Turkey, Caucasus, Russia (Europe to Middle Siberia), Middle East. Introduced to Canada, United States
- T. melinum Simon, 1900 – Hawaii
- T. mendozae Berland, 1933 – Marquesas Is.
- T. meneghettii Caporiacco, 1949 – Kenya
- T. metabolum Chamberlin & Ivie, 1936 – Panama
- T. metator Simon, 1907 – Guinea-Bissau
- T. michelbacheri Levi, 1957 – United States
- T. micheneri Levi, 1963 – Panama
- T. minutissimum Keyserling, 1884 – Panama, Peru
- T. minutulum Thorell, 1895 – Myanmar
- T. miranda Bellvert & Arnedo, 2021 – Hawaii
- T. miserum Thorell, 1898 – Myanmar
- T. modestum (Simon, 1894) – Sri Lanka
- T. modonatum Wunderlich, 2023 – Portugal
- T. molliculum Thorell, 1899 – Cameroon
- T. mollissimum L. Koch, 1872 – Australia, Samoa
- T. monzonense Levi, 1963 – Peru
- T. mortuale Simon, 1908 – Australia (Western Australia)
- T. morulum O. Pickard-Cambridge, 1898 – United States, Mexico
- T. mucidum Gao & Li, 2014 – China
- T. murarium Emerton, 1882 – Canada, United States, Mexico
- T. musivivoides Schmidt & Krause, 1995 – Cape Verde
- T. musivivum Schmidt, 1956 – Azores, Canary Islands, Madeira
- T. myersi Levi, 1957 – United States, Mexico, Jamaica. Introduced to Galapagos
- T. mystaceum L. Koch, 1870 – Europe, Turkey, Russia (Europe to South Siberia), China
- T. mysteriosum Schmidt, 1971 – Ecuador
- T. nadleri Levi, 1959 – Trinidad
- T. nagorum Roberts, 1983 – Seychelles (Aldabra)
- T. nasinotum Caporiacco, 1949 – Kenya
- T. nasutum Wunderlich, 1995 – Italy (Sardinia)
- T. necijaense Barrion & Litsinger, 1995 – Philippines
- T. negebense Levy & Amitai, 1982 – Italy (Sicily), Israel, Spain?
- T. neomexicanum Banks, 1901 – Canada, United States
- T. neshamini Levi, 1957 – United States
- T. nigriceps Keyserling, 1891 – Brazil
- T. nigroannulatum Keyserling, 1884 – Ecuador, Peru
- T. nigroplagiatum Caporiacco, 1949 – Kenya
- T. nigropunctulatum Thorell, 1898 – Myanmar
- T. nigrosacculatum Tullgren, 1910 – Tanzania
- T. nilgherinum Simon, 1905 – India
- T. niphocosmum Rainbow, 1916 – Australia (Queensland)
- T. niveopunctatum Thorell, 1898 – Myanmar
- T. niveum O. Pickard-Cambridge, 1898 – Mexico
- T. nivosum Rainbow, 1916 – Australia (Queensland)
- T. nodiferum Simon, 1895 – Sri Lanka
- T. nojimai Yoshida, 1999 – China, Japan
- T. nudum Levi, 1959 – Mexico, Panama
- T. oatesi Thorell, 1895 – Myanmar
- T. ochreolum Levy & Amitai, 1982 – Cyprus, Israel, Iran
- T. octoferum Strand, 1909 – South Africa
- T. odisha Prasad, Caleb, Tyagi & Kumar, 2019 – India
- T. odoratum Zhu, 1998 – China
- T. omiltemi Levi, 1959 – Mexico, Guatemala
- T. onticolum Levi, 1963 – Peru
- T. opolon Levi, 1963 – Brazil
- T. opuntia Levi, 1963 – Mexico
- T. orgea (Levi, 1967) – Brazil
- T. orlando (Archer, 1950) – United States
- T. osprum Levi, 1963 – Venezuela
- T. oswaldocruzi Levi, 1963 – Brazil
- T. otsospotum Barrion & Litsinger, 1995 – Philippines
- T. palanum Roberts, 1983 – Seychelles (Aldabra)
- T. pallasi Ponomarev, 2007 – Russia (Europe)
- T. pallidulum Roewer, 1942 – Tanzania
- T. pandani Simon, 1895 – Vietnam
- T. panganii Caporiacco, 1947 – Tanzania
- T. papillatum Gao & Li, 2014 – China
- T. paraense Levi, 1963 – Brazil
- T. parvulum Blackwall, 1870 – Italy (Sicily)
- T. parvum Keyserling, 1884 – Peru
- T. patrizii Caporiacco, 1933 – Libya
- T. pelaezi Levi, 1963 – Mexico
- T. pennsylvanicum Emerton, 1913 – Canada, United States
- T. perkinsi Simon, 1900 – Hawaii
- T. pernambucum Levi, 1963 – Brazil
- T. perpusillum Simon, 1886 – Malaysia
- T. petraeum L. Koch, 1872 – North America, Europe, Morocco, Caucasus, Russia (Europe to Far East), Kazakhstan
- T. petrunkevitchi Berland, 1920 – Kenya
- T. phaeostomum Simon, 1909 – Vietnam
- T. pictum (Walckenaer, 1802) – North America, Europe, North Africa, Caucasus, Russia (Europe to Far East), Kazakhstan, Turkemenistan, China, Japan. Introduced to South Africa (type species)
- T. pierre Levi & Patrick, 2013 – United States
- T. pigrum Keyserling, 1886 – Brazil
- T. pilatum Urquhart, 1893 – Australia (Tasmania)
- T. pinastri L. Koch, 1872 – Europe, Turkey, Caucasus, China, Korea, Japan
- T. pinguiculum Simon, 1909 – Vietnam
- T. pinicola Simon, 1873 – Spain, France (Corsica), Morocco, Algeria, Tunisia
- T. pires Levi, 1963 – Brazil
- T. piriforme Berland, 1938 – Vanuatu
- T. plaumanni Levi, 1963 – Venezuela, Brazil
- T. plectile Simon, 1909 – Vietnam
- T. plumipes van Hasselt, 1882 – Indonesia (Sumatra)
- T. pluviale Tullgren, 1910 – Tanzania
- T. poecilum Zhu, 1998 – China
- T. porphyreticum Urquhart, 1889 – New Zealand
- T. positivum Chamberlin, 1924 – United States, Caribbean to Paraguay
- T. posticatum Simon, 1900 – Hawaii
- T. postmarginatum Tullgren, 1910 – Tanzania
- T. praeclusum Tullgren, 1910 – Tanzania
- T. praemite Simon, 1907 – Sierra Leone
- T. praetextum Simon, 1900 – Hawaii
- T. prominens Blackwall, 1870 – Italy
- T. promiscuum Domènech & Crespo, 2020 – Spain
- T. prospero Bellvert & Arnedo, 2021 – Hawaii
- T. proximum Lawrence, 1964 – St. Helena, South Africa
- T. puellae Locket, 1980 – Comoros
- T. pulanense Hu, 2001 – China
- T. punctipes Emerton, 1924 – United States, Mexico
- T. punicapunctatum Urquhart, 1891 – New Zealand
- T. punongpalayum Barrion & Litsinger, 1995 – Philippines
- T. purcelli O. Pickard-Cambridge, 1904 – St. Helena, Namibia, South Africa
- T. pyramidale L. Koch, 1867 – Australia (Queensland, New South Wales)
- T. pyrenaeum Denis, 1945 – Spain, France, Andorra
- T. quadratum (O. Pickard-Cambridge, 1882) – Sri Lanka, Indonesia (Sumatra)
- T. quadrilineatum Lenz, 1886 – Madagascar
- T. quadripapulatum Thorell, 1895 – Myanmar
- T. quadripartitum Keyserling, 1891 – Brazil
- T. rabuni Chamberlin & Ivie, 1944 – Canada, United States, Bahamas
- T. rafflesi Simon, 1899 – Indonesia (Sumatra)
- T. rampum Levi, 1963 – Peru, Venezuela
- T. ravum Levi, 1963 – Venezuela
- T. reinhardti Charitonov, 1946 – Uzbekistan
- T. resum Levi, 1959 – Panama
- T. retreatense Strand, 1909 – South Africa
- T. retrocitum Simon, 1909 – Vietnam
- T. rhodonotum Simon, 1909 – Vietnam
- T. ricense Levi, 1959 – Puerto Rico
- T. rossi Levi, 1963 – Peru
- T. rostriferum Simon, 1895 – Gabon
- T. rothi Levi, 1959 – Mexico
- T. rubiginosum Keyserling, 1884 – Brazil
- T. rubrum (Keyserling, 1886) – Brazil
- T. rurrenabaque Levi, 1963 – Bolivia
- T. ruwenzoricola Strand, 1913 – DR Congo
- T. saanichum Chamberlin & Ivie, 1947 – Alaska, Canada, United States
- T. sabinjonis Strand, 1913 – DR Congo, Uganda, Rwanda
- T. samoense Berland, 1929 – Samoa
- T. sanctum Levi, 1959 – Mexico
- T. sardis Chamberlin & Ivie, 1944 – United States
- T. saropus Thorell, 1887 – Myanmar
- T. schlingeri Levi, 1963 – Peru
- T. schrammeli Levi, 1963 – Mexico
- T. semitinctum Simon, 1914 – Spain (mainland, Balearic Is.), France, Italy
- T. senckenbergi Levi, 1963 – Venezuela
- T. septempunctatum Berland, 1933 – Marquesas Is.
- T. sertatum Simon, 1909 – Vietnam
- T. setiferum Roewer, 1942 – Myanmar
- T. setosum L. Koch, 1872 – Australia (Queensland), Vanuatu, Samoa, New Caledonia
- T. setum Zhu, 1998 – China
- T. sibiricum Marusik, 1988 – Russia (Urals to Far East), Kazakhstan, Mongolia
- T. sinaloa Levi, 1959 – Mexico
- T. soaresi Levi, 1963 – Brazil, Paraguay
- T. societatis Berland, 1934 – French Polynesia (Society Is.: Tahiti)
- T. spinigerum Rainbow, 1916 – Australia (Queensland)
- T. spinitarse O. Pickard-Cambridge, 1876 – North Africa, Saudi Arabia, Yemen
- T. spinosissimum Caporiacco, 1934 – India (Karakorum)
- T. squalidum Urquhart, 1886 – New Zealand
- T. squamosum Gao & Li, 2014 – China
- T. stamotum Levi, 1963 – Venezuela
- T. stannardi Levi, 1963 – Mexico
- T. strepitus Peck & Shear, 1987 – Galapagos
- T. striatum Keyserling, 1884 – Brazil
- T. styligerum F. O. Pickard-Cambridge, 1902 – Mexico, Guatemala
- T. subitum O. Pickard-Cambridge, 1885 – Pakistan
- T. submirabile Zhu & Song, 1993 – China, Korea
- T. submissum Gertsch & Davis, 1936 – United States, Mexico, Bahama Is. Jamaica
- T. subpingue Simon, 1908 – Australia (Western Australia)
- T. subplaumanni Liu & Peng, 2012 – China
- T. subradiatum Simon, 1901 – Singapore
- T. subrotundum Keyserling, 1891 – Brazil
- T. subundatum Zhou, Irfan & Peng, 2024 – China
- T. subvittatum Simon, 1889 – India
- T. sulawesiense Marusik & Penney, 2004 – Indonesia (Sulawesi)
- T. swarczewskii Werjbitzky, 1902 – Azerbaijan
- T. sycorax Bellvert & Arnedo, 2021 – Hawaii
- T. t-notatum Thorell, 1895 – Myanmar, Malaysia, Singapore
- T. taegense Paik, 1996 – Korea
- T. tahitiae Berland, 1934 – Tahiti
- T. tamerlani Roewer, 1942 – Myanmar
- T. tayrona Müller & Heimer, 1990 – Colombia
- T. tebanum Levi, 1963 – Venezuela
- T. teliferum Simon, 1895 – Sri Lanka
- T. tenellum C. L. Koch, 1841 – Greece
- T. tengchongense Liu & Peng, 2012 – China
- T. tenuissimum Thorell, 1898 – Myanmar
- T. teresae Levi, 1963 – Trinidad, Brazil
- T. teroshriensis Biswas, 2025 – Bangladesh
- T. tessellatum Thorell, 1899 – Cameroon
- T. teutanoides Caporiacco, 1949 – Kenya
- T. thalia Workman, 1878 – Myanmar
- T. theridioides (Keyserling, 1890) – China, Australia (Queensland, New South Wales)
- T. thorelli L. Koch, 1865 – Australia (New South Wales)
- T. timpanogos Levi, 1957 – United States
- T. tinctorium Keyserling, 1891 – Brazil
- T. todinum Simon, 1880 – New Caledonia
- T. topo Levi, 1963 – Ecuador
- T. torosum Keyserling, 1884 – Peru
- T. trahax Blackwall, 1866 – south-east equatorial Africa
- T. transgressum Petrunkevitch, 1911 – United States, Mexico
- T. trepidum O. Pickard-Cambridge, 1898 – Mexico to Panama
- T. trifile Simon, 1907 – Sierra Leone, Kenya, Tanzania
- T. trigonicum Thorell, 1890 – Indonesia (Sumatra, Java)
- T. tristani Levi, 1959 – Costa Rica
- T. triviale Thorell, 1881 – Australia
- T. trizonatum Caporiacco, 1949 – Kenya
- T. tubicola Doleschall, 1859 – Indonesia (Java, Moluccas), New Guinea
- T. turanicum Charitonov, 1946 – Uzbekistan
- T. turrialba Levi, 1959 – Costa Rica
- T. uber Keyserling, 1884 – Brazil
- T. uhligi Martin, 1974 – France to Russia (Europe)
- T. umbilicus Levi, 1963 – Brazil
- T. uncatum F. O. Pickard-Cambridge, 1902 – Mexico
- T. undatum Zhu, 1998 – China
- T. undulanotum Roewer, 1942 – Vanuatu
- T. urnigerum Thorell, 1898 – Myanmar
- T. ursoi Caporiacco, 1947 – Ethiopia
- T. urucum Levi, 1963 – Brazil
- T. usitum Strand, 1913 – DR Congo
- T. utcuyacu Levi, 1963 – Peru
- T. valleculum Levi, 1959 – Panama
- T. vallisalinarum Levy & Amitai, 1982 – Israel
- T. vanhoeffeni Strand, 1909 – South Africa
- T. varians Hahn, 1833 – Europe, North Africa, Turkey, Caucasus, Russia (Europe to Far East), Kazakhstan, Iran, Central Asia, China. Introduced to Canada, United States
  - T. v. cyrenaicum Caporiacco, 1933 – Libya
  - T. v. rusticum Simon, 1873 – France, Italy
- T. ventricosum Rainbow, 1916 – Australia (Queensland)
- T. vespertinum Levy, 1985 – Israel
- T. viridanum Urquhart, 1887 – New Zealand
- T. volubile Keyserling, 1884 – Venezuela, Ecuador, Peru, Galapagos
- T. vosseleri Strand, 1907 – Tanzania
- T. vossioni Simon, 1884 – Sudan
- T. vulvum Levi, 1959 – Panama
- T. weberi Thorell, 1893 – Singapore
- T. weyrauchi Levi, 1963 – Peru
- T. whitcombi Sedgwick, 1974 – Chile
- T. wiehlei Schenkel, 1938 – Spain, Morocco, Algeria, Russia (Europe), Kazakhstan
- T. workmani Thorell, 1887 – Myanmar
- T. xanthostichum (Rainbow, 1916) – Australia (Queensland)
- T. yani Zhu, 1998 – China
- T. yuma Levi, 1963 – United States
- T. yunnanense Schenkel, 1963 – China
- T. zantholabio Urquhart, 1886 – New Zealand
- T. zebra Caporiacco, 1949 – Kenya
- T. zekharya Levy, 2007 – Israel
- T. zhangmuense Hu, 2001 – China
- T. zhaoi Zhu, 1998 – China
- T. zhoui Zhu, 1998 – China
- T. zonarium Keyserling, 1884 – Peru
- T. zonulatum Thorell, 1890 – India, China, Thailand, Singapore, Indonesia (Sumatra, Borneo)
