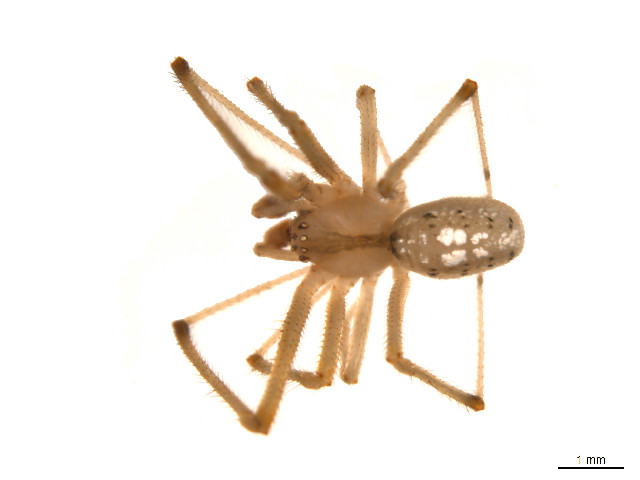
- T. californicum, male
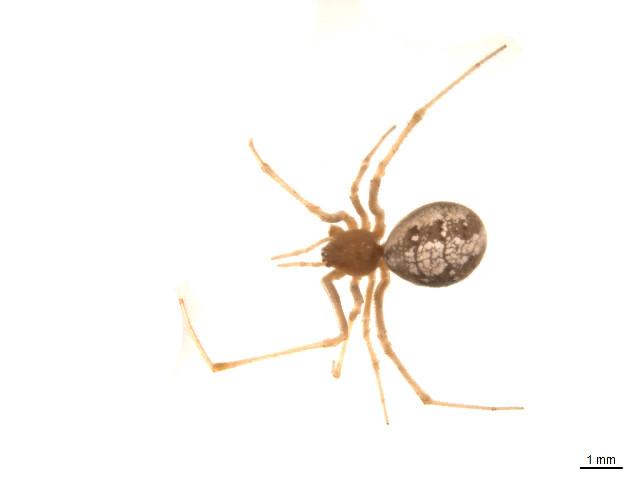
- T. californicum, female

Scientific classification
- Kingdom: Animalia
- Phylum: Arthropoda
- Subphylum: Chelicerata
- Class: Arachnida
- Order: Araneae
- Infraorder: Araneomorphae
- Family: Theridiidae
- Genus: Theridion
- Species: T. californicum

Binomial name
- Theridion californicum Banks, 1904

= Theridion californicum =

Species of spider

Theridion californicum is a species of cobweb spider in the family Theridiidae. It is found in the United States and Canada.
