= Theridion dedux =

Theridion comb-feet spider

Scientific classification
- Kingdom: Animalia
- Phylum: Arthropoda
- Subphylum: Chelicerata
- Class: Arachnida
- Order: Araneae
- Infraorder: Araneomorphae
- Family: Theridiidae
- Genus: Theridion
- Species: T. dedux

Binomial name
- Theridion dedux O. Pickard-Cambridge, 1904

Species of spider

Theridion dedux is a species of spider in the family Theridiidae. It is endemic to South Africa and is commonly known as the Theridion comb-feet spider.

== Distribution ==
Theridion dedux is found only in South Africa. It is known from KwaZulu-Natal at Durban and Kloof.

== Habitat and ecology ==
This species builds a conical retreat of twigs and leaves in its three-dimensional web. It has been recorded from the Indian Ocean Coastal Belt biome at 17 m altitude.

== Description ==
The carapace is pale yellow marked with indistinct yellow-brown in normal indentations. The abdomen is oval, pale white to dusky yellow brown covered with long bristles with no distinct pattern, only two to three indistinct dusky lines on the sides.

== Conservation ==
Theridion dedux is listed as Data Deficient by the South African National Biodiversity Institute. The species is known from only two localities with a very small range. The status of the species remains obscure. More sampling is needed to determine the species range.

== Taxonomy ==
Theridion dedux was described by Octavius Pickard-Cambridge in 1904 from Durban. The species has not been revised and is known from both sexes.
