= Theridion bradyanum =

Simonstown Theridion comb-foot spider

Scientific classification
- Kingdom: Animalia
- Phylum: Arthropoda
- Subphylum: Chelicerata
- Class: Arachnida
- Order: Araneae
- Infraorder: Araneomorphae
- Family: Theridiidae
- Genus: Theridion
- Species: T. bradyanum

Binomial name
- Theridion bradyanum Strand, 1907

Species of spider

Theridion bradyanum is a species of spider in the family Theridiidae. It is endemic to South Africa and is commonly known as the Simonstown Theridion comb-foot spider.

== Distribution ==
Theridion bradyanum is found only in South Africa. It is known from the Western Cape at Simonstown.

== Habitat and ecology ==
This species builds a conical retreat of twigs and leaves in its three-dimensional labyrinth web. It has been recorded from the Fynbos biome at 125 m altitude.

== Conservation ==
Theridion bradyanum is listed as Data Deficient by the South African National Biodiversity Institute. The species is known only from the type locality with a very small range. The status of the species remains obscure. More sampling is needed to determine the species range.

== Taxonomy ==
Theridion bradyanum was described by Embrik Strand in 1907 from Simonstown in the Western Cape. The species has not been revised. It is known from both sexes but has not been illustrated.
