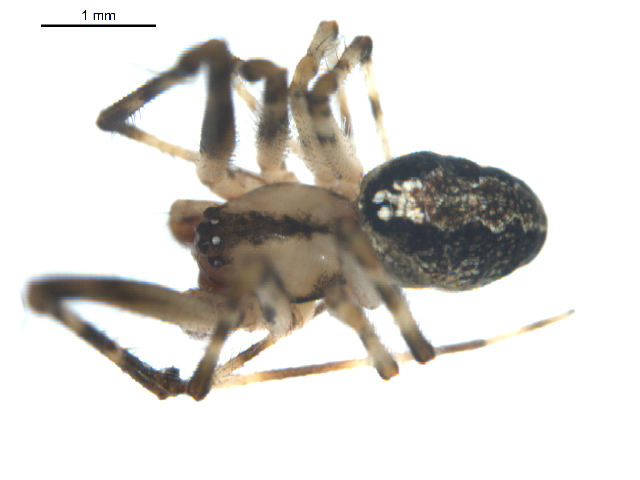
- Theridion murarium, male
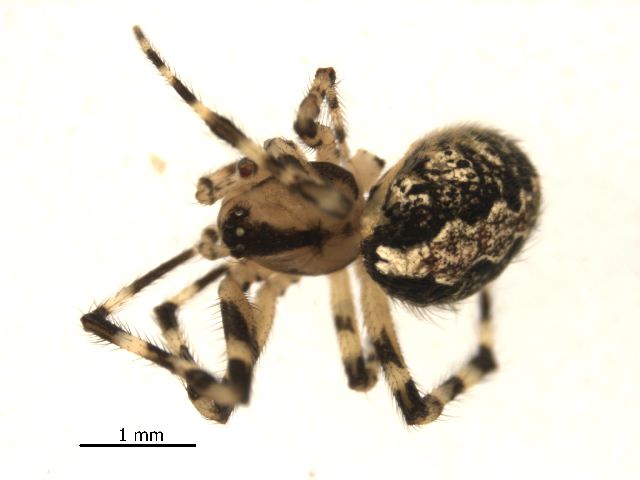
- Theridion murarium, female

Scientific classification
- Kingdom: Animalia
- Phylum: Arthropoda
- Subphylum: Chelicerata
- Class: Arachnida
- Order: Araneae
- Infraorder: Araneomorphae
- Family: Theridiidae
- Genus: Theridion
- Species: T. murarium

Binomial name
- Theridion murarium Emerton, 1882

= Theridion murarium =

Species of spider

Theridion murarium is a species of cobweb spider in the family Theridiidae. It is found in North America.
