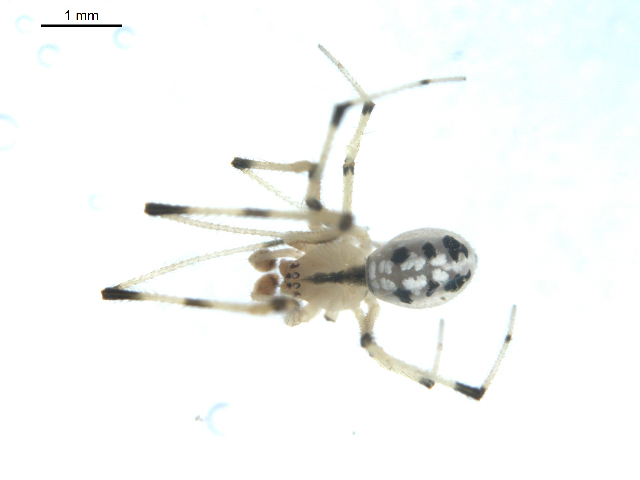
- T. albidum, adult male

Scientific classification
- Kingdom: Animalia
- Phylum: Arthropoda
- Subphylum: Chelicerata
- Class: Arachnida
- Order: Araneae
- Infraorder: Araneomorphae
- Family: Theridiidae
- Genus: Theridion
- Species: T. albidum

Binomial name
- Theridion albidum Banks, 1895

= Theridion albidum =

Species of spider

Theridion albidum is a species of cobweb spider in the family Theridiidae. It is found in the United States and Canada.
