= Theridion proximum =

Scientific classification
- Kingdom: Animalia
- Phylum: Arthropoda
- Subphylum: Chelicerata
- Class: Arachnida
- Order: Araneae
- Infraorder: Araneomorphae
- Family: Theridiidae
- Genus: Theridion
- Species: T. proximum

Binomial name
- Theridion proximum Lawrence, 1964

Synonyms
- Theridion proxima Lawrence, 1964

Species of spider

Theridion proximum is a species of spider in the family Theridiidae. It is found in Saint Helena and South Africa.

== Distribution ==
Theridion proximum is found in Saint Helena and South Africa. In South Africa it is known from the Western Cape at Oudtshoorn Skeleton Cave.

== Habitat and ecology ==
This species constructs three-dimensional webs in dark places and has been sampled from a cave at 357 m altitude.

== Description ==
The carapace is yellow with a very fine brown margination, cephalic portion and thoracic fovea brown, eyes surrounded by blackish brown rings.

Legs are yellow with femora bearing two subapical and tibiae bearing four blackish annulations, metatarsi with smaller basal, middle and apical annulations with the middle one faint or obsolete.

The abdomen dorsally has a black area surrounding the light median longitudinal band which is diffuse, with a large white marking on each side in the posterior third near the lateral margin. The ventral surface has spinnerets surrounded by a blackish ring which is continuous with the median blackish area of the dorsal surface, and a medium-sized white spot below the epigastric fold.

== Conservation ==
Theridion proximum is listed as Data Deficient for taxonomic reasons by the South African National Biodiversity Institute. The species is known from only one locality in South Africa with a very small range. The status of the species remains obscure. More sampling is needed to collect the male and to determine the species range.

== Taxonomy ==
Theridion proximum was described by Reginald Frederick Lawrence in 1964 from Oudtshoorn Skeleton Cave in the Western Cape. The species has not been revised. The male was first described by Sherwood et al. in 2024 from Saint Helena specimens.
