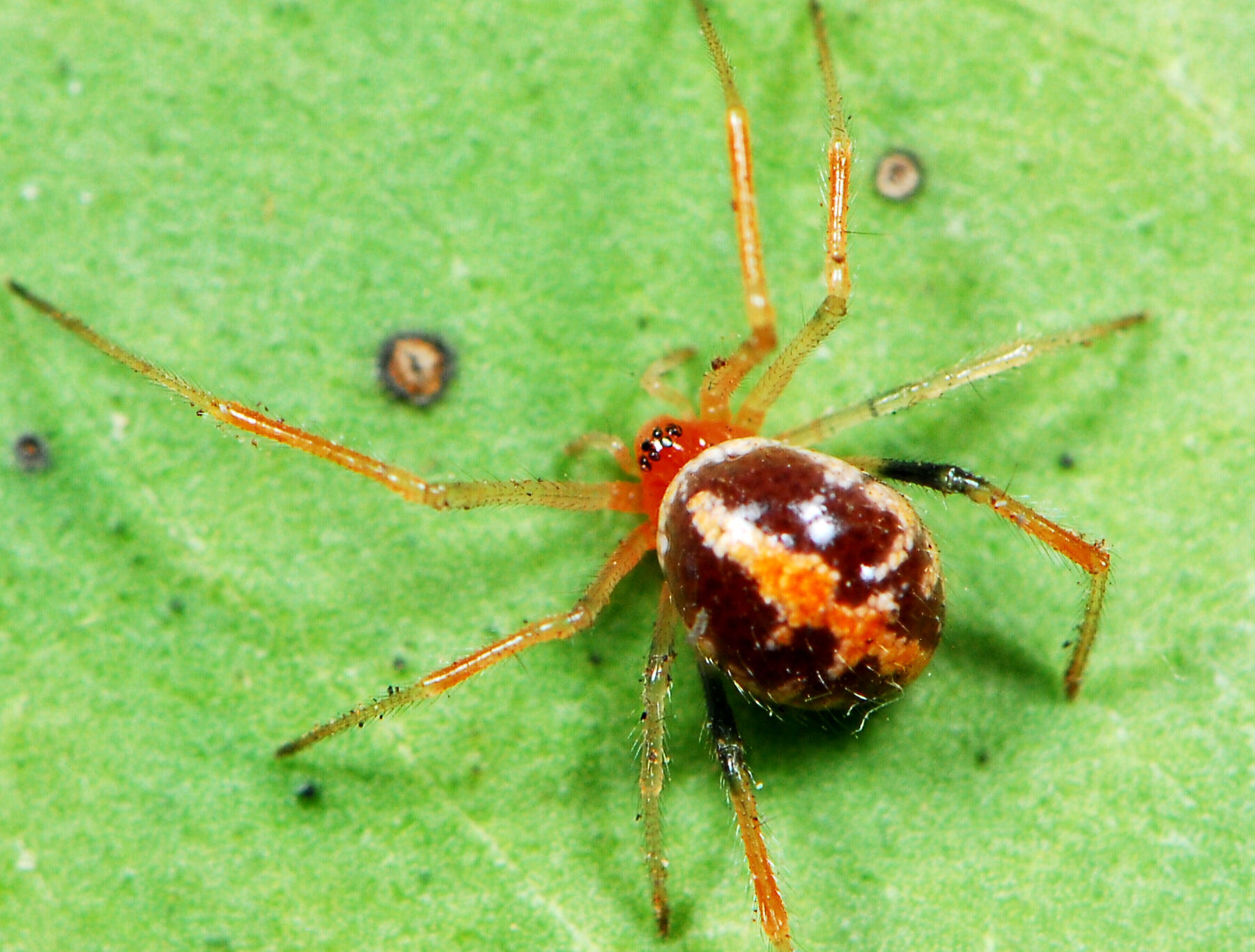
- Female
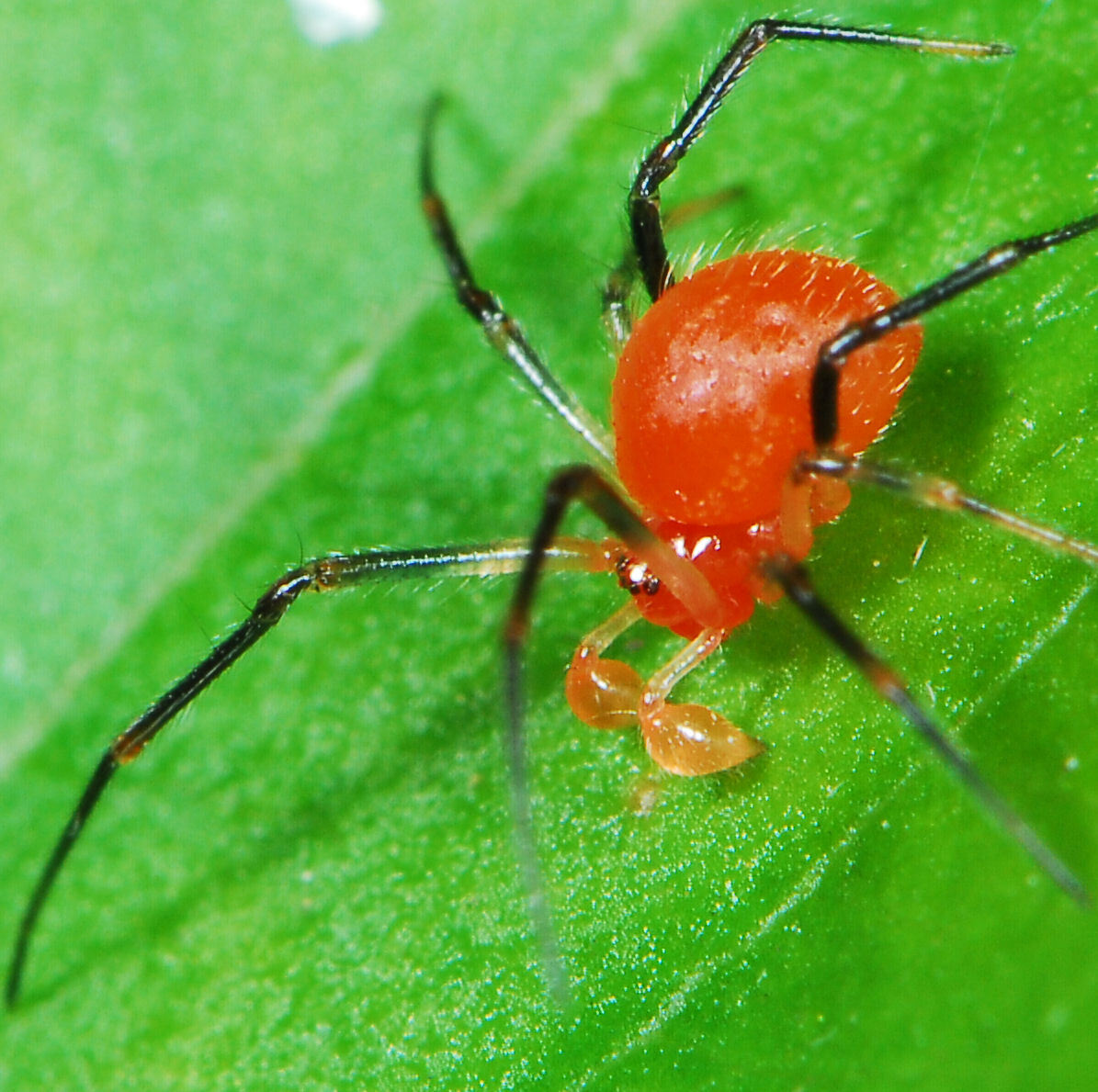
- Juvenile male

Scientific classification
- Kingdom: Animalia
- Phylum: Arthropoda
- Subphylum: Chelicerata
- Class: Arachnida
- Order: Araneae
- Infraorder: Araneomorphae
- Family: Theridiidae
- Genus: Theridion
- Species: T. delicatum

Binomial name
- Theridion delicatum O. Pickard-Cambridge, 1904

= Theridion delicatum =

Constantia Theridion comb-feet spider

Species of spider

Theridion delicatum is a species of spider in the family Theridiidae. It is found in Zimbabwe and South Africa, and is commonly known as the Constantia Theridion comb-feet spider.

== Distribution ==
Theridion delicatum is found in Zimbabwe and South Africa. In South Africa it is known from the Eastern Cape and Western Cape.

== Habitat and ecology ==
This species builds a conical retreat of twigs and leaves in its three-dimensional web. It has been recorded from the Fynbos and Savanna biomes at altitudes ranging from 15 to 64 m.

== Description ==
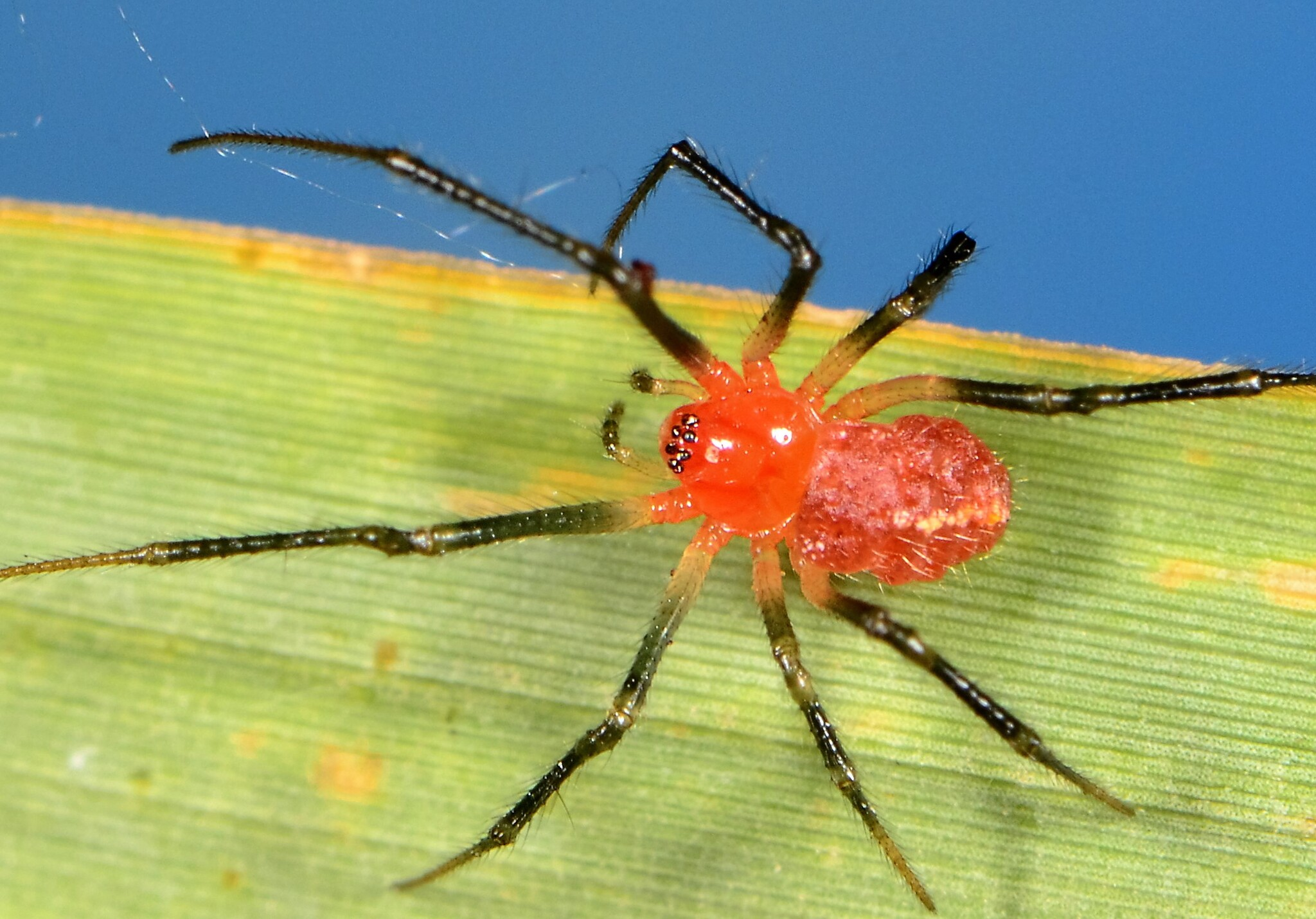
female

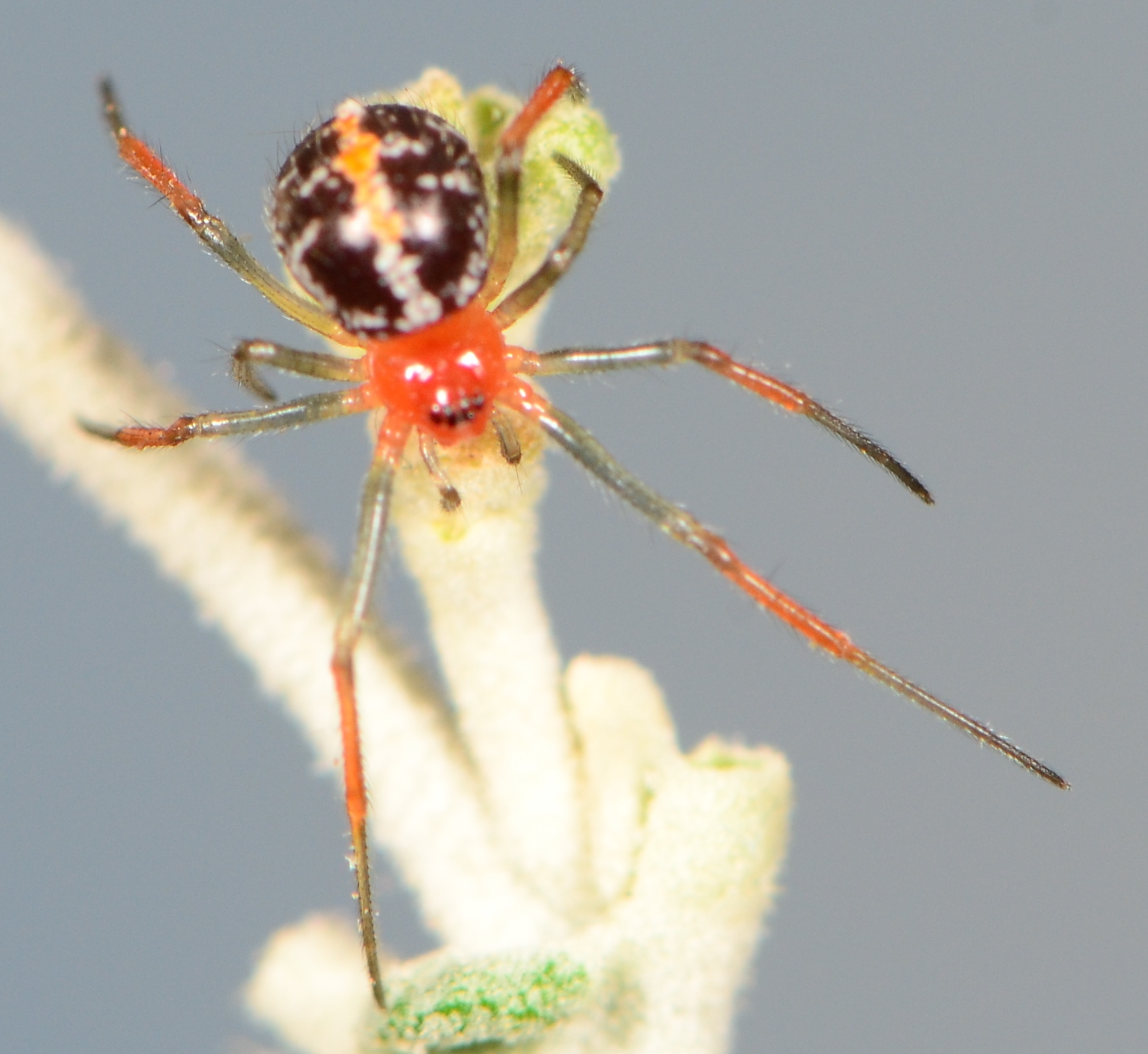
female

The abdomen is large, almost globular, dull orange yellow marked faintly with a white longitudinal central line with two to three slightly oblique lines on each side. The lines on the abdomen are formed by minute white spots.

== Conservation ==
Theridion delicatum is listed as Least Concern by the South African National Biodiversity Institute. Although only known from one sex, this species has a large distribution and is therefore not considered threatened. It is protected in De Hoop Nature Reserve.

== Taxonomy ==
Theridion delicatum was described by Octavius Pickard-Cambridge in 1904 from Constantia Flats in the Western Cape. The species has not been revised and is known only from the female.
