= Theridion auberti =

Aubert Theridion comb-foot spider

Scientific classification
- Kingdom: Animalia
- Phylum: Arthropoda
- Subphylum: Chelicerata
- Class: Arachnida
- Order: Araneae
- Infraorder: Araneomorphae
- Family: Theridiidae
- Genus: Theridion
- Species: T. auberti

Binomial name
- Theridion auberti Simon, 1904

Species of spider

Theridion auberti is a species of spider in the family Theridiidae. It is endemic to South Africa and is commonly known as the Aubert Theridion comb-foot spider.

== Distribution ==
Theridion auberti is found only in South Africa. It is known from Limpopo at Shiluvane.

== Habitat and ecology ==
This species builds a conical retreat of twigs and leaves in its three-dimensional labyrinth web. It has been sampled from the Savanna biome at 689 m altitude.

== Conservation ==
Theridion auberti is listed as Data Deficient for taxonomic reasons by the South African National Biodiversity Institute. The species is known only from the type locality with a very small range. The status of the species remains obscure. More sampling is needed to collect the male and to determine the species range.

== Taxonomy ==
Theridion auberti was described by Eugène Simon in 1904 from Shiluvane in the Limpopo. The species has not been revised and is known only from the female.
