= Theridion nodiferum =

Scientific classification
- Kingdom: Animalia
- Phylum: Arthropoda
- Subphylum: Chelicerata
- Class: Arachnida
- Order: Araneae
- Infraorder: Araneomorphae
- Family: Theridiidae
- Genus: Theridion
- Species: T. nodiferum

Binomial name
- Theridion nodiferum Simon, 1895

Species of spider

Theridion nodiferum, is a species of spider of the genus Theridion. It is endemic to Sri Lanka.

== Description ==
Both male and female Theridion nodiferum (or Theridion in general) grow 5 mm to 10 mm (0.19 inches to 0.39 inches) in length.
