= Theridion elegantissimum =

Scientific classification
- Kingdom: Animalia
- Phylum: Arthropoda
- Subphylum: Chelicerata
- Class: Arachnida
- Order: Araneae
- Infraorder: Araneomorphae
- Family: Theridiidae
- Genus: Theridion
- Species: T. elegantissimum

Binomial name
- Theridion elegantissimum Roewer, 1942

Synonyms
- Theridion elegans Saito, 1933 – preoccupied; Theridion elegans – Lee, 1966; Theridion elegans – Hu, 1984

Species of spider

Theridion elegantissimum is a species of spider in the family Theridiidae. It is endemic to Taiwan.
