= Theridion strepitus =

Scientific classification
- Kingdom: Animalia
- Phylum: Arthropoda
- Subphylum: Chelicerata
- Class: Arachnida
- Order: Araneae
- Infraorder: Araneomorphae
- Family: Theridiidae
- Genus: Theridion
- Species: T. strepitus

Binomial name
- Theridion strepitus Peck & Shear, 1987

Species of spider

Theridion strepitus is a blind cave spider found only on the Galapagos Islands. It is in the family Theridiidae and does not have eyes.
