= Theridion vanhoeffeni =

Van Hoeff's Theridion comb-feet spider

Scientific classification
- Kingdom: Animalia
- Phylum: Arthropoda
- Subphylum: Chelicerata
- Class: Arachnida
- Order: Araneae
- Infraorder: Araneomorphae
- Family: Theridiidae
- Genus: Theridion
- Species: T. vanhoeffeni

Binomial name
- Theridion vanhoeffeni Strand, 1909

Species of spider

Theridion vanhoeffeni is a species of spider in the family Theridiidae. It is endemic to South Africa and is commonly known as Van Hoeff's Theridion comb-feet spider.

== Distribution ==
Theridion vanhoeffeni is found only in South Africa. It is known from the Western Cape at Simonstown.

== Habitat and ecology ==
It has been sampled from the Fynbos biome at 125 m altitude.

== Conservation ==
Theridion vanhoeffeni is listed as Data Deficient for taxonomic reasons by the South African National Biodiversity Institute. The species is known only from the type locality with a very small range. The status of the species remains obscure. More sampling is needed to collect adults and to determine the species range.

== Taxonomy ==
Theridion vanhoeffeni was described by Embrik Strand in 1909 from Simonstown in the Western Cape. The species has not been revised and is known only from juveniles. It has not been illustrated.
