= Theridion pennsylvanicum =

Scientific classification
- Kingdom: Animalia
- Phylum: Arthropoda
- Subphylum: Chelicerata
- Class: Arachnida
- Order: Araneae
- Infraorder: Araneomorphae
- Family: Theridiidae
- Genus: Theridion
- Species: T. pennsylvanicum

Binomial name
- Theridion pennsylvanicum Emerton, 1913

Species of spider

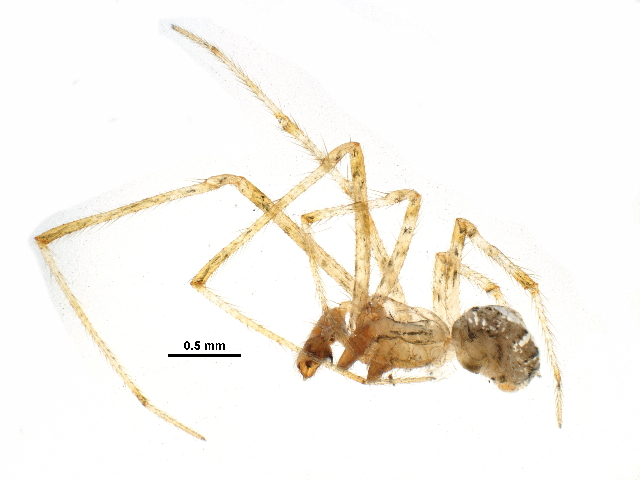

Theridion pennsylvanicum is a spider in the family Theridiidae ("cobweb spiders"), in the infraorder Araneomorphae ("true spiders"). The distribution range of Theridion pennsylvanicum includes the USA and Canada.
