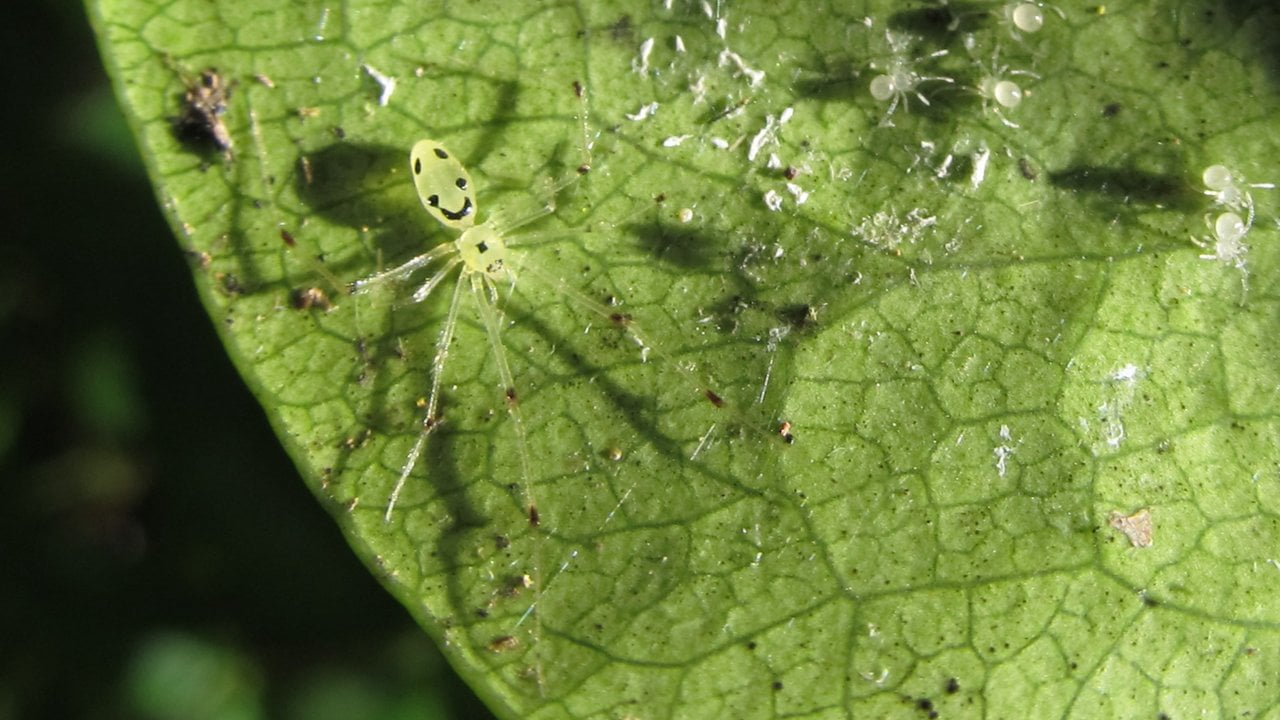

Scientific classification
- Kingdom: Animalia
- Phylum: Arthropoda
- Subphylum: Chelicerata
- Class: Arachnida
- Order: Araneae
- Infraorder: Araneomorphae
- Family: Theridiidae
- Genus: Theridion
- Species: T. grallator

Binomial name
- Theridion grallator Simon, 1900

= Theridion grallator =

Species of spider in the family Theridiidae

Theridion grallator, also known as the Hawaiian happy-face spider, is a spider in the family Theridiidae that resides on the Hawaiian Islands. T. grallator gets its vernacular name of "Hawaiian happy-face spider" from the unique patterns superimposed on its abdomen, specifically those that resemble a smiley face. T. grallator is particularly notable because of its wide range of polymorphisms that may be studied to allow a better understanding of evolutionary mechanisms. In addition to the variety of color polymorphisms present, T. grallator demonstrates the interesting quality of diet-induced color change, in which its appearance temporarily changes as it metabolizes various food items.

== Description ==
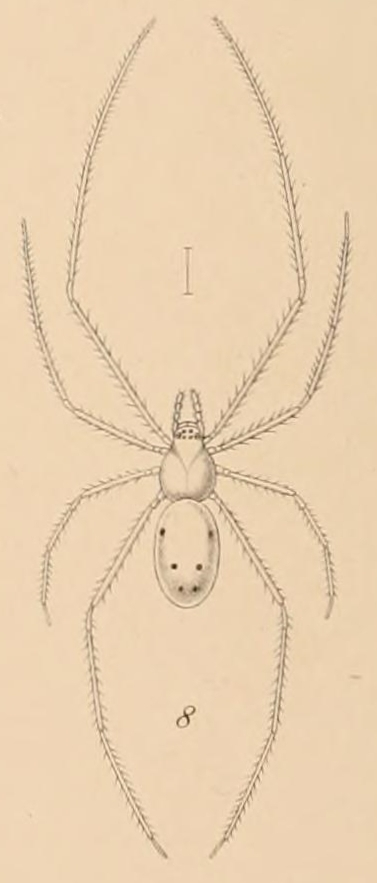
Female

T. grallator is a small spider with a body size less than 5 millimeters long. It has characteristically long and slender legs and a translucent yellow body. These distinctly long legs lead T. grallator to have the most divergent bodily morphology out of all the members of its clade. This unique characteristic occurred as a result of an ecological or behavioral shift.

Its abdomen is often pale, translucent yellow, and can also contain a variety of red, white, and/or black superimposed patterns. Certain morphs have a pattern resembling a smiley face or a grinning clown face on their yellow body, hence their vernacular name. These patterns differ from island to island. Some lack abdominal markings altogether. Abdominal color changes from translucent yellow to green or orange, depending on diet. The variety of polymorphisms present in T. grallator allows an evolutionary benefit to evade predation. Spiders with depigmentation or polymorphic colors and patterns can avoid predation by birds that use a search image when scanning for prey. A search image may be a particularly abundant color morph, and predators will use this as an identification of possible prey.

=== Color morphs ===
A key characteristic of T. grallator is the presence of a large variety of abdominal color morphs. The ratio of unpatterned to patterned morphs is relatively constant throughout the year. It is also constant between and within populations regardless of climate and elevation, indicating some form of selection acting to maintain these proportions. Although across all of the Hawaiian islands, there is a similar frequency of the discrete morphs, there are different genetic bases for these morphs between islands. The various morphs are assigned to a series of broad categories that characterize the abdominal color and/or its patterned patches. These categories include: Yellow, Red front, Red back, Red front and back, Red lines, Red ring, Black ring, Red/black ring, Red blob, Red/black blob, and White.

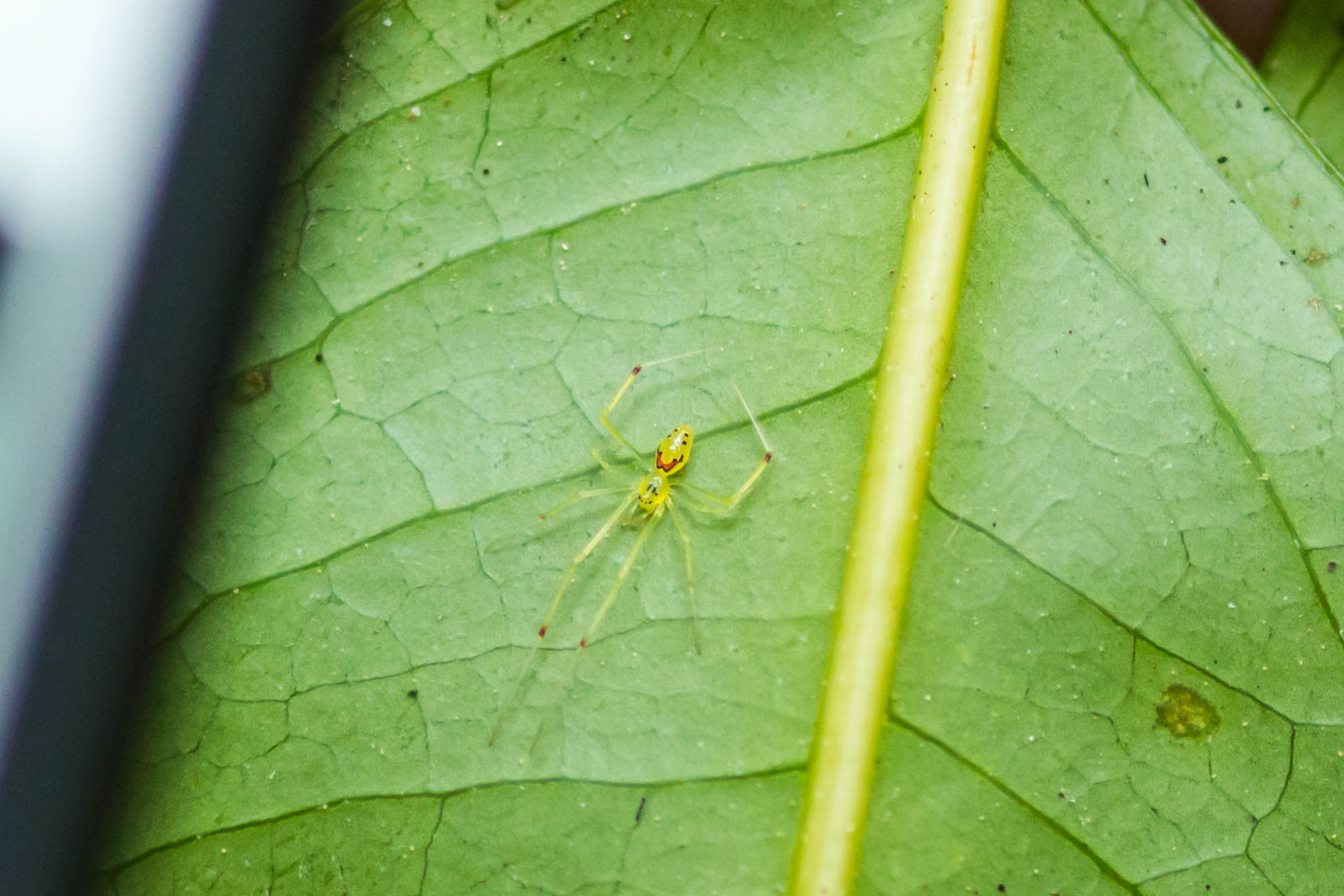
T. grallator with the unique pattern on abdomen

=== Genetic factors underlying color morphs ===
These color polymorphisms follow simple Mendelian genetics. The most common morph is Yellow, which makes up 70% of populations. Genetic studies of these morphs have shown that the Yellow morph, which is also known as the "unpatterned" morph, is recessive to all patterned morphs. Within patterned morphs, the amount of pigment present in the abdomen is correlated with the dominance of the associated allele. The alleles that are associated with black, red, or white pigments are arranged in a hierarchical structure and exhibit dominant effects. In addition, unpatterned morphs are recessive to patterned morphs. Lastly, White is dominant to nearly all morphs. The White morph is produced by a massive deposit of guanine below the hypodermis, a structure derived from the ectoderm. The presence of this white background is beneficial when bright-colored morphs are advantageous. Guanine is the main nitrogenous excretory product in spiders. These deposits create a white background between the brown digestive diverticula, a structure of the midgut, and the hypodermis. These guanine deposits and their distribution within the body are under the control of a major gene loci in T. grallator. This major gene loci is under the control of two mechanisms. These two mechanisms respond to the presence or absence of guanine and send chemical signals between the hypodermis and digestive diverticula to adjust morph pigmentation. In addition, these two mechanisms may function independently or together. The first mechanism operates by inhibiting the effect of guanine on pigmentation; thus, unpigmented areas will contain a layer of guanine beneath. The second mechanism operates by inducing guanine with light, resulting in guanine deposits present under unpigmented areas. Guanine is found only under the red and black hypodermal pigments that form the various morph patterns. White and Red lines exhibit codominance. There appears to be no sex-linkage in the distribution of morphs between sexes.

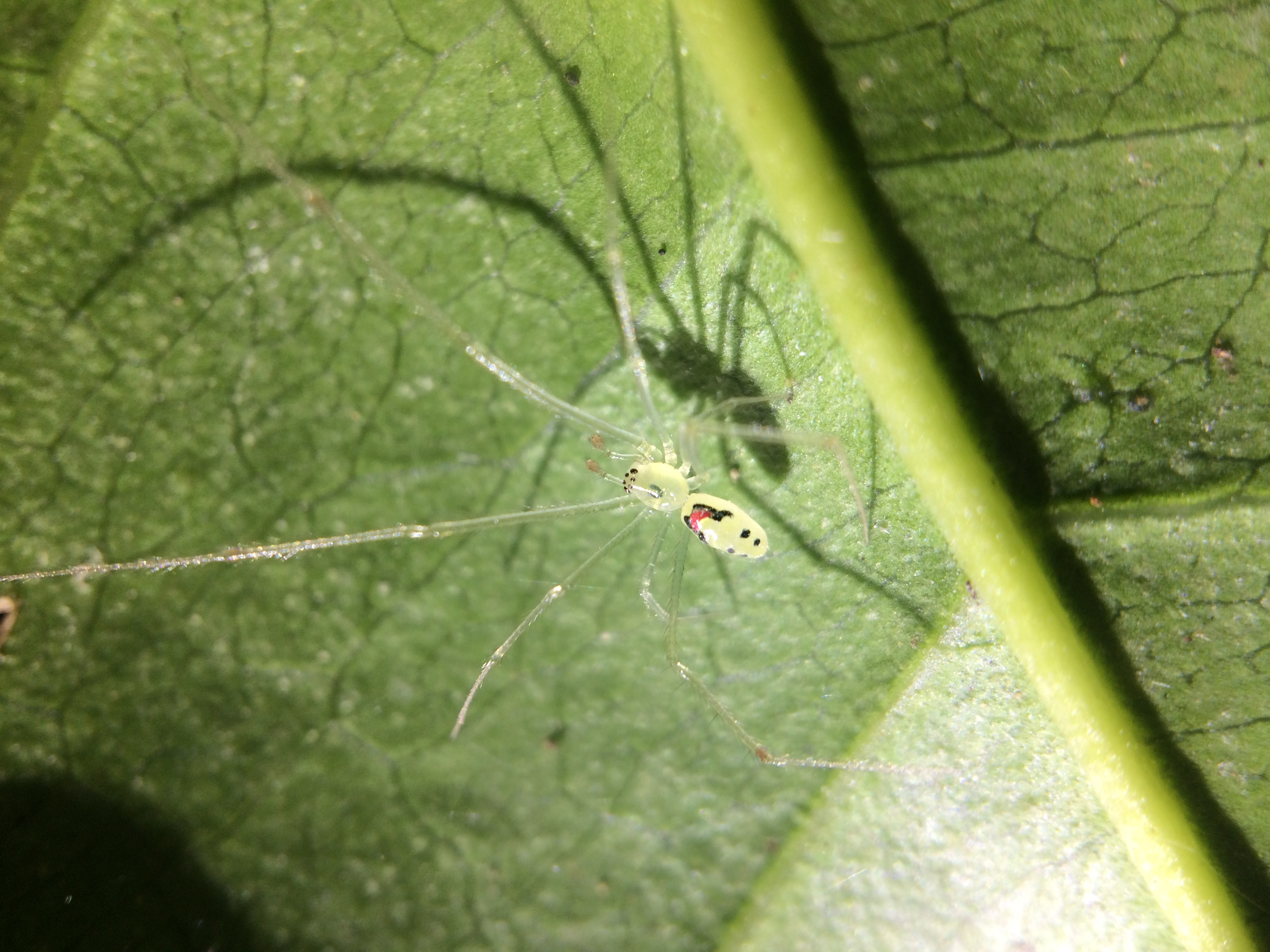
Red front morph

Theridion grallator is known for its exuberant carapace and opisthosoma (abdomen) patterning. Opisthosomal morphs appear to be dictated by alleles at one autosomal locus. Dominance typically comes from superimposing one pattern over the other. The linkage between loci may be responsible for the association between carapace and opisthosomal patterns. Although there is a possibility of pleiotropic effects of alleles at one particular locus, it is not likely given the associated patterning on the carapace and abdomen. One example of this is the red and black opisthosoma pigmentation with guanine deposits, showing the benefit of the visual effects of these color polymorphisms.

== Population structure, speciation, and phylogeny ==
=== Close relatives ===
At least nine species in the Hawaiian islands have been identified to be members of the T. grallator-clade based on the analysis of genitalia patterns. This clade is believed to have been colonized from the Americas and is closely related to the genus Exalbidion. The closest relatives of T. grallator are other Hawaiian species, such as Theridion posticatum, Theridion kauaiense, and Theridion californicum. In T. grallator as well as T. californicum, there is one inconspicuous morph (namely, Yellow in T. grallator) that is the most common and an assortment of less common and seemingly more conspicuous morphs. This "T. grallator clade" may be more closely related to the genus Exalbidion than to any other species currently classified in the genus Theridion. Molecular clock data estimates that T. grallator first diverged from its ancestors about 4.22 Ma.

Most of the Hawaiian Theridion are believed to be closely related except for T. actitarase, which contains a number of common traits with the related Rugathodes genus. Similar traits include the palpal organ and certain genitalia features. There is another Theridion species, which remains unnamed, that also displays features that are distinct from most Hawaiian Theridion. However, this unnamed species does contain a few characteristics that resemble the T. grallator, namely, its long legs and abdominal shape. Thus, this unnamed Theridion species may have evolved under similar evolutionary pressures as T. grallator. Despite some variations in the bodily appearance of the Theridion species, there still remains a uniformity in sexual behavior. There is also a highly uniform web-building behavior and structure. There has been much debate on how to organize clades and construct an appropriate phylogenetic structure of Theridiidae, and work is still being done to properly classify these species.

=== Genetic population structure ===
The genetic bases of the abdominal color morphs of the T. grallator vary by island despite the actual abdominal color morphs having an identical appearance throughout the islands. On Maui, the color morphs of T. grallator originated from one locus while those on Hawai’i have at least two unlinked loci involved in the color polymorphisms. In addition, on Maui, all polymorphisms are attributed to individual alleles while on Hawai’i, there are two pairs of color morphs that may depend on one single locus that is differentially expressed in males and females. One pair of these differentially expressed morphs is the Yellow and Red fronts, where the morph manifests phenotypically as Yellow in females but Red in males. Similarly, the Red blob and Red ring in Hawai’i populations have a varied manifestation between the sexes with the Red blob in females and Red ring in males. These differences in phenotypes are most likely due to differential expression and not sex-linkage.

The different genetic backgrounds in the color morphs of T. grallator in Maui and Hawai’i are due to the difference in ages of the two islands and their colonization. Maui emerged first, followed by Hawai’i. Because of the presence of some sex-selective morphs in Hawai’i - a phenomenon not observed in Maui - it is likely that a shift in inheritance pattern occurred due to evolutionary pressures. Currently, there is very little exchange of individuals amongst the Hawaiian islands, as shown by the distinct formation of monophyletic clades on each island. Despite the difference in genetic backgrounds and the rare exchange of individuals, hybrid matings between islands can still produce viable offspring. This indicaties that T. grallator on Maui and Hawai’i are not too differentiated from one another.

=== Evolution and selection ===
The evolutionary significance of the color polymorphisms of T. grallator is elusive, but there are selection pressures acting on the various morph proportions. The Yellow morph sometimes exists in proportions of about 70% of the total population. The remaining portion of the population displays a variety of the patterned morphs. This high skew toward the Yellow morph indicates that there must be evolutionary significance involved in this specific polymorphism. The predominant theory to explain this skew is predator selection. Because T. grallator resides on the underside of green leaves, the Yellow morph provides them a degree of conspicuousness under the sunlight. This allows them to better evade predators. However, there still exist advantages to the other color polymorphisms despite their lower observed frequencies. This can also be explained in terms of predation. Females benefit much more from the Yellow morph because they are largely sedentary, residing on their leaves most of the time. The male T. grallator is much more mobile and spends much of its time on the ground, searching for mates. Without the shield of the leaf, the Yellow morph will not always be the most beneficial to males; some rarer patterned morphs provide an increased level of conspicuousness and thus allow these males to evade predators. Thus, when the Yellow morph reaches a frequency higher than normal, the Yellow morph females may shift their preference to these conspicuously patterned males. Until this patterned morph no longer provides an advantage from predators, females will continue to place their preference on these patterned morphs.

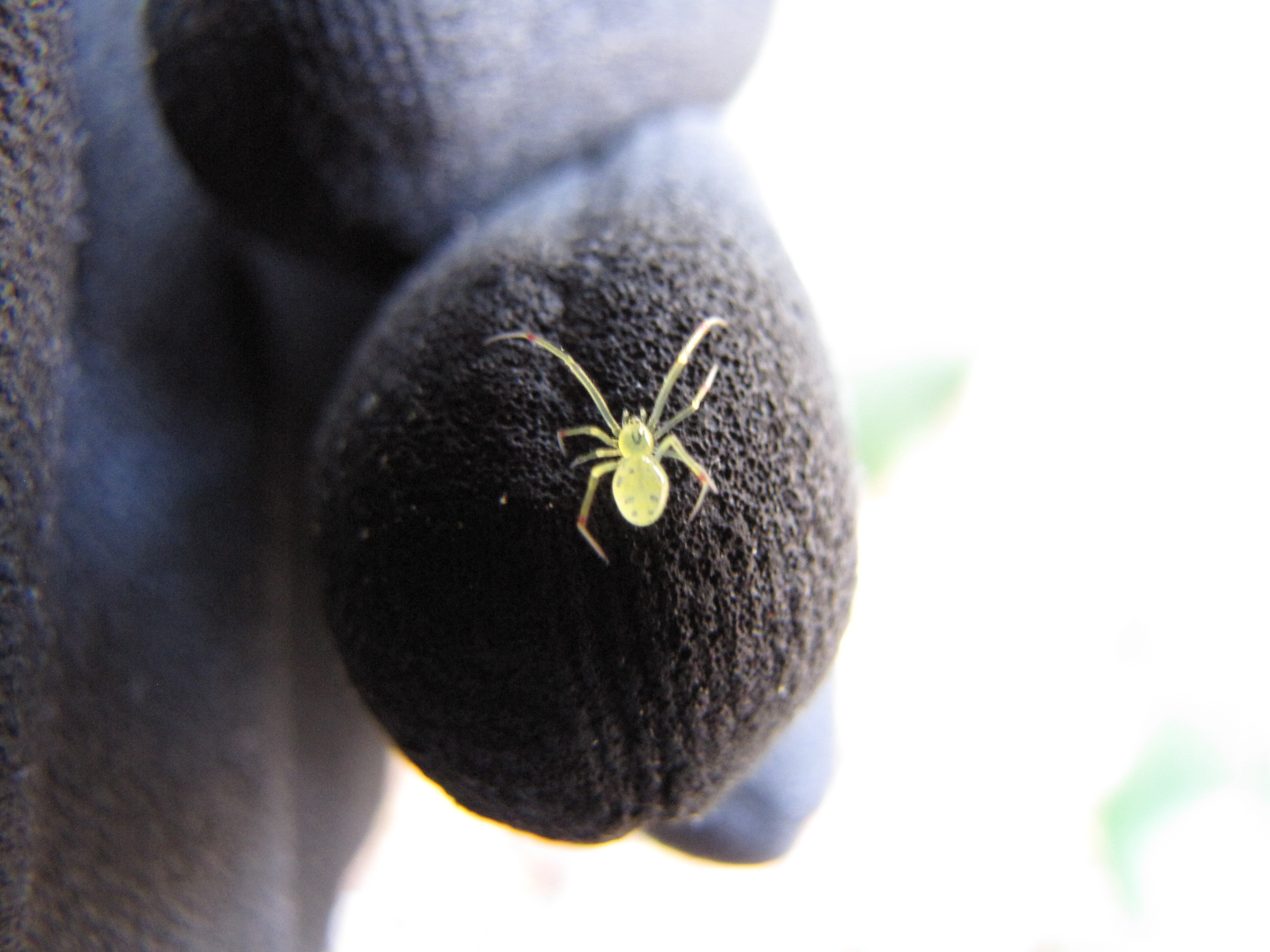
T. grallator on gloved hand

The mosaic nature of Hawaiian the islands has allowed for the differentiation of adaptive color variations and polymorphisms. At the younger sites, there is less genetic diversity and the older locations have a much higher diversity of haplotypes.

== Habitat and distribution ==
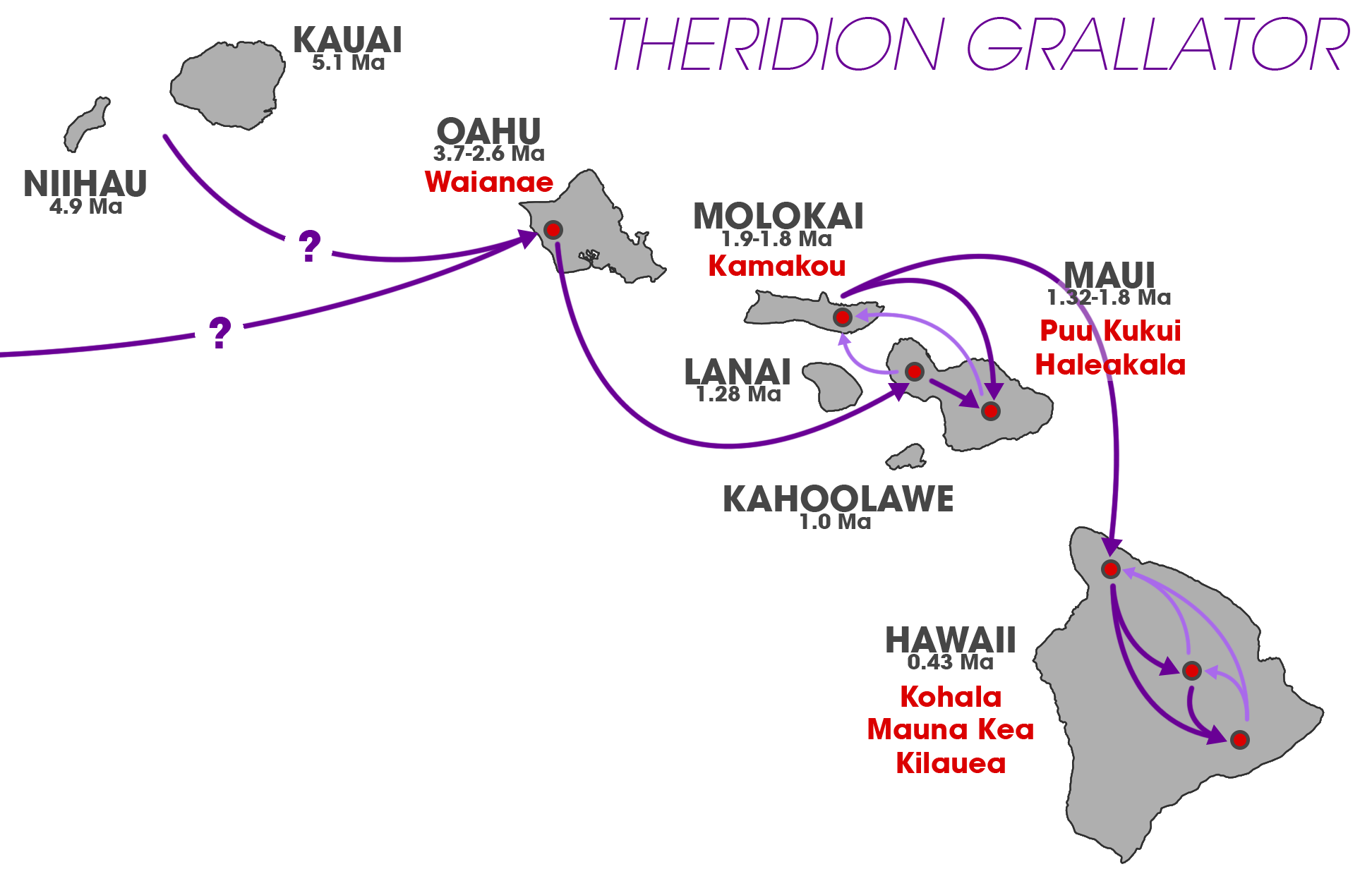
The colonization routes of Theridion grallator on the Hawaiian archipelago. Dark purple lines indicate colonization occurring in conjunction with island age. Light purple indicates a reverse colonization. T. grallator is not present on Kauai or Niihau so colonization may have occurred from there, or the nearest continent.

=== Habitat ===
T. grallator inhabits wet and mesic environments. Wet environments are defined as having an annual rainfall from 200 to 350 centimeters and mesic environments are defined as having an annual rainfall of 100 to 200 centimeters. These spiders are found in the forests of the Hawaiian Islands. They have been found on the islands of O’ahu, Moloka’i, Maui, and Hawai’i. They prefer to reside on the underside of plant leaves such as the native Broussaisia arguta and Clermontia arborescens and the introduced Hedychium coronarium. H. coronarium is a particularly tactical plant to reside on as its large, slippery leaves allow T. grallator to better evade predation.

These spiders have been seen in kipukas, areas that have been surrounded by lava flows. However, they are not found in the lava flows surrounding the area.

=== Geographic distribution ===
T. grallator is endemic to the Hawaiian archipelago. Sparsely distributed populations have been reported from Oʻahu, Molokaʻi, Maui and the island of Hawaiʻi in rainforests at elevations of 300–2,000 m (980–6,560 ft).

The proportion of color morphs somewhat varies between the islands of Maui and Hawai’i. On Maui, the most common patterned morph is the Red front, which contains a red “U” on the anterior dorsum. The opisothoma color morphs Yellow, Red front, Red blob, and Red ring are found in both male and female T. grallator in Maui. However, in Hawai’i, these morphs are sex-selective with Yellow and Red blob appearing in females only and Red front and Red ring in males only. The Yellow and Red front as well as the Red blob and Red ring are controlled by the same alleles in females and males, respectively.

== Diet ==
=== Diet-induced color change ===
T. grallator spiders may change color depending on their diet. This color change may occur because of the translucent quality of their abdomens. The opisothoma of T. grallator, like in most spiders, is thin and thus relatively transparent. Because of the transparent nature of its opisothoma, substances from the diet can be observed within the body. Usually, digestive products appear a dark brown-black color. At times, various pigments from the dietary byproducts are deposited in the hypodermis of T. grallator. These pigments may arise if they confer selective advantages - pigments may be dull or vibrant in hue. A common color change is from the translucent yellow to orange, most likely due to the high level (approximately 70%) of dietary consumption of dipterans. Upon consumption of other types of prey, the T. grallator may temporarily change to other colors such as dark brown. Color pigments can be retained in the abdomen for two to six days. Once the food is digested and excreted, the color of the abdomen returns to its original translucent pale yellow.

=== Adult predatory feeding ===
T. grallator spiders do not utilize webs to capture prey, so they do not follow the sit-and-wait method of web-building spiders. Instead, they will forage freely, often traveling to nearby leaves to capture insects. During prey capture, T. grallator spiders use their silk. Common prey include Dolichopodidae and Drosophilidae. There is no correlation between prey preference and resident leaf species. However, depending on the species of the resident leaf, T. grallator may exhibit different predator behavior. For example, on Hedychium leaves, these spiders are more aggressive toward prey despite often having a lower prey capture rate as compared to residence on other species of plants.

== Predators ==
Carnivorous caterpillars from the genus Eupithecia have been observed attacking T. grallator. There are several species of Eupithecia on the Hawaiian islands that prey on T. grallator. These caterpillars lie on leaves and may attack spiders that make contact with the ends of their bodies. When attacked, T. grallator attempts to bite the caterpillar and flee.

Eleutherodactylus coqui is an invasive species of frog originally from Puerto Rico that preys on T. grallator. It was spotted in Hawai'i in the 1980s.

== Webs ==
T. grallator lives beneath the leaves of plants, where they spin a relatively small two-dimensional web. Webs are usually found on the undersides of leaves and occasionally in the crevices of trees. T. grallator webs are often very flimsy and even tangled. This is very typical of the Theridiid spiders. T. grallator builds small webs that are much flimsier than the webs built by most Theridiidae. Webs are not highly utilized, which may be the result of evolutionary pressures of Hawaii's climate that made these webs disadvantageous. The high level of rainfall damages the glue of the web's silk threads, leading to ineffective prey capture. Instead of using the web as a prey-detection medium, T. grallator detects prey through vibrations that are transmitted by the prey species through the resident leaf. Spiders are then able to discern the location and orientation of these prey.

Often, the building of small webs is associated with a specialization in prey type, but this is not observed to be the case in T. grallator. During the day, T. grallator spiders tightly cling to the undersides of leaves to evade predation by gleaning birds. At night, when diurnal predatory birds are asleep, these spiders will hang by silk threads under the leaf. Although T. grallator exhibits only minimal use of webs, they can use their silk to capture prey. T. grallator will sense prey based on vibrations and will orient itself near the prey of interest. Then, the spider turns around rapidly and tosses its silk onto the prey to unravel it. The silk consists of a sticky substance that will allow for efficient prey capture. In addition, maternal T. grallator spiders may use webs to guard their egg sacs or store the prey they have caught for their young.

== Reproduction and life cycle ==
During the last molt of a female T. grallator, a mature male may share a leaf with her. Once the female completes her molt, the male will copulate with her. A few weeks after copulation, the female will deposit her egg sacs and will remain closely attached to the egg sacs by a short silk thread until the eggs have hatched. When the egg sacs are ready to hatch, the maternal female T. grallator will loosen the silk that is wrapped around the eggs to allow the spiderlings to emerge.

T. grallator populations seasonally fluctuate in terms of spider size and sex make-up. During winter months, specifically October to March, there is a higher proportion of smaller sized and immature spiders. In the spring, specifically May to August, there is an increased number of adults in the population with the majority of these adults being maternal females. In fact, up to 85% of a population can consist of maternal females with egg sacs in these later months.

There is a variation in morph frequencies between mature and immature T. grallator individuals. Mature spiders do not contain the black or maroon patterns that are observed in spiderlings. In addition, the Red blob morph, characterized by red pigment covering the entire abdomen, has a much higher frequency in adult T. grallator. Therefore, it can be inferred that maroon and black patterns in spiderlings develop into the Red blob morph patterns once they mature into adults.

== Mating ==
=== Female/male interactions ===
Mature males actively move through forest vegetation seeking out females, which tend to be more sedentary. Courtship depends primarily on vibrations and olfaction. For example, males may carry out a courtship dance that involves somatic movements and web-plucking. These vibrations during the courting performance are assessed by potential female mates. Copulation occurs at night, while both spiders hang from the underside of the leaf. Males die soon after mating, but females live longer, and guard their eggs until they hatch, catching prey for their young.

In addition, a rare-male advantage phenomenon during mating has been observed. Females may prefer a rarer male morph for many reasons. For example, a less common morph may better evade predation. This rare morph may then be selected for and will increase in number until it no longer provides the inconspicuous advantage from predators – an example of apostatic selection, which is a type of negative frequency-dependent selection. The advantage will be eliminated when predators begin to recognize this rarer pattern and thus will begin to target these patterned morphs. This phenomenon of the rare-male mating advantage may act more strongly on reproductive males than females because males are much more mobile during reproductive season.

In addition, T. grallator belongs to a family of spiders with very low levels of visual acuity. Thus, female spiders' preference for males with these rarer patterned morphs is not attributed to physical attractiveness but instead to this advantage from predators. In fact, due to their poor vision, males court females using vibratory and olfactory signals.

== Parental care ==
=== Egg guarding ===
A maternal female T. grallator is notably aggressive against intruders right after the hatching of her young, while she is guarding her egg sac. She must protect her young from predation, parasitic wasps, and the possibility of the resident leaf dropping. Once the spiderlings have hatched, the maternal female continues to defend and care for her young. The mother demonstrates exceptional maternal care as she communally feeds all the spiderlings and protects them from predators. Spiderlings remain on the same leaf with their mother for approximately 40 to 100 days. Spiderlings are unable to catch their own prey during this first period of their life and die in the absence of the mother. The mother wraps all prey that she catches in her silk and is never observed to consume the prey itself.

This aggressive guarding behavior improves reproductive success because of the susceptibility of egg sacs to predation. If a maternal T. grallator dies or abandons her egg sac, the egg sac is captured by a predator in less than a week. When a maternal T. grallator guards and remains with her egg sac, there is a 57.2% hatching success rate. This signifies the advantage in egg sac guarding.

=== Adoption ===
Mothers take on foster egg sacs with acceptance. When spiderlings are transferred between broods, the new mothers ‘adopt’ these spiderlings into their family and care for them as if they were their own. Adoption of spiderlings may occur if the related mother has been lost. Losing one’s mother is generally a result of predation or old age. Spiderlings who lose their mother either leave their resident leaf by dropping down a silk thread or climbing down the stem or stalk of the plant. These spiderlings may attempt to survive on their own but often may migrate to other leaves and join another brood. Mothers are very receptive in adopting spiderlings, regardless of the color morph. In addition, the lack of competition within a brood contributes to the ease of acceptance of adopted spiderlings.

=== Parent-offspring conflict ===
Parent-offspring conflict may occur in the costs of mothers guarding their spiderlings. When a maternal female T. grallator has a second brood, she must remain with the first brood for a period of time after hatching because of the spiderlings' inability to feed themselves. Thus, the second brood may be compromised due to the need for parental investment by the first brood.

== Social behavior ==
Adult females are usually sedentary and located on the underside of leaves while males are often more mobile as they may move about in the search of mates. Thus, due to male mobility, they often become more conspicuous to predators. Gravid females and females guarding egg sacs will never share a leaf with other adult T. grallator.

Competition for food resources between members of the same brood has not been observed. Siblicide and cannibalism have also not been observed.

== Parasitism ==
T. grallator experiences high rates of parasitism by wasps in the Baeus genus. These wasps have also been found to parasitize other spiders, including Clubiona robusta. Parasitism contributes to a high rate of egg mortality. The wasp's small egg size may explain the high rates of parasitism of these spiders. Mothers may have a hard time detecting if their egg-sacs have been parasitized. Baeus parasitic behavior occurs even when the mother guards her eggs.
