= Frequency-dependent foraging by pollinators =

Animal behavior

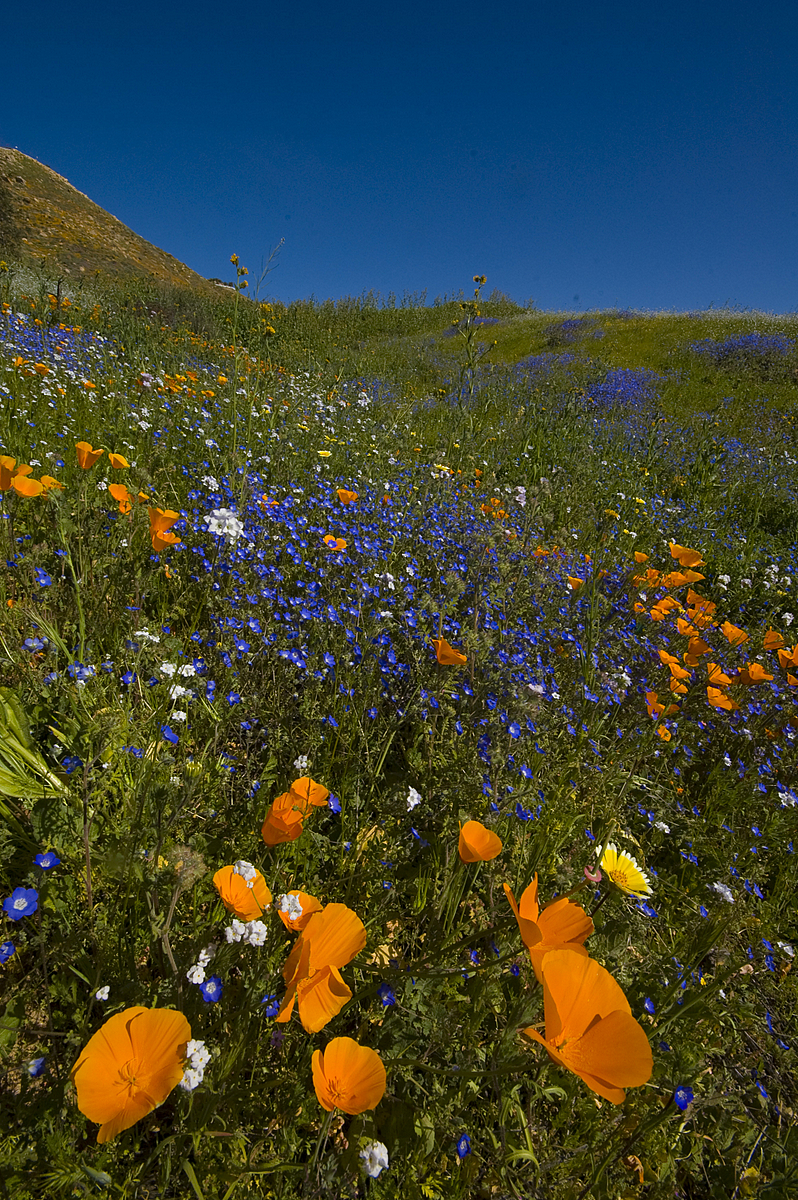
Wildflowers of various corolla colours, shapes and sizes.

Frequency-dependent foraging is defined as the tendency of an individual to selectively forage on a certain species or morph based on its relative frequency within a population. Specifically for pollinators, this refers to the tendency to visit a particular floral morph or plant species based on its frequency within the local plant community, even if nectar rewards are equivalent amongst different morphs. Pollinators that forage in a frequency-dependent manner will exhibit flower constancy for a certain morph, but the preferred floral type will be dependent on its frequency. Additionally, frequency-dependent foraging differs from density-dependent foraging as the latter considers the absolute number of certain morphs per unit area as a factor influencing pollinator choice. Although density of a morph will be related to its frequency, common morphs are still preferred when overall plant densities are high.

== Background ==
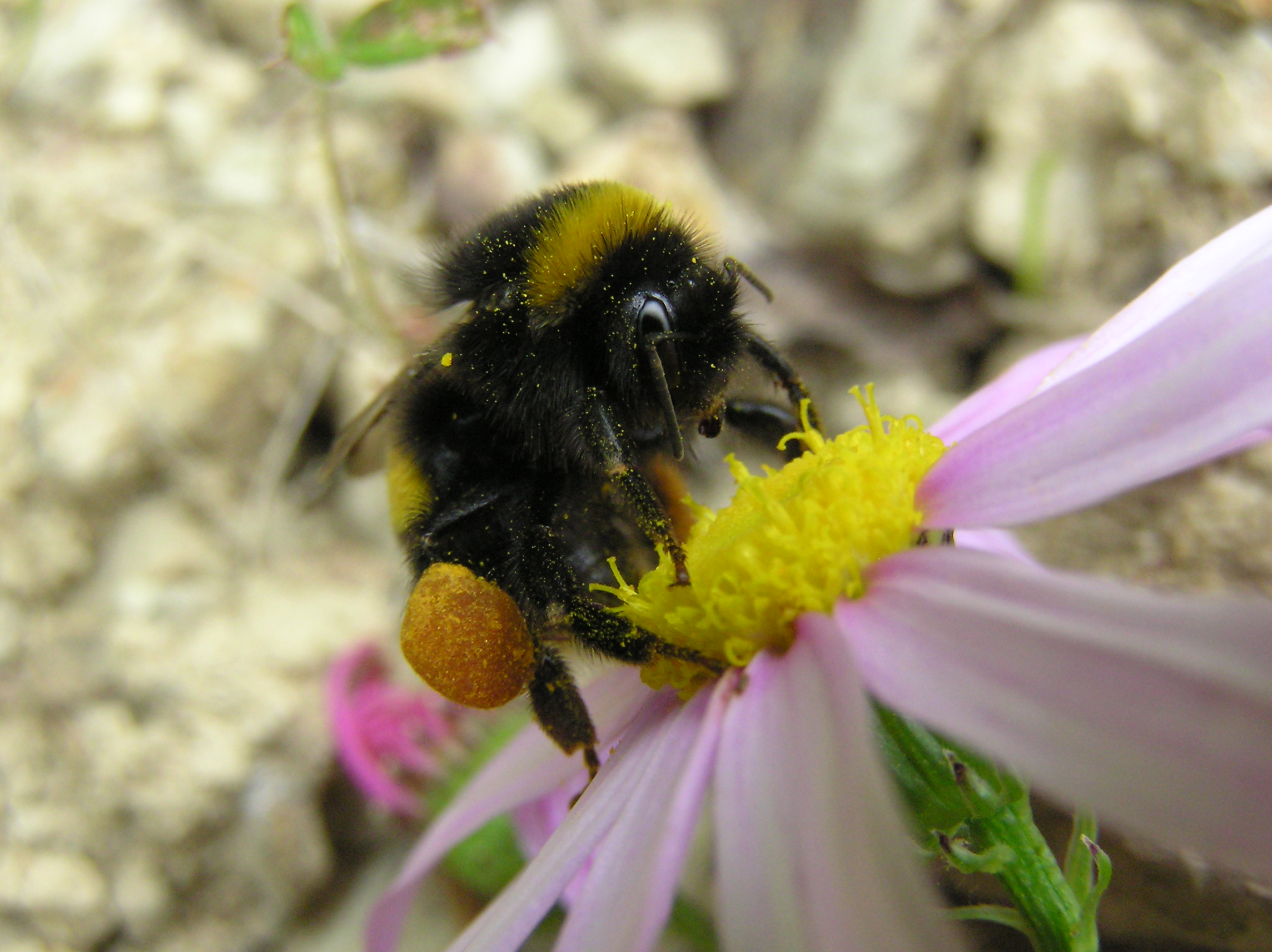
Bumblebee (probably Bombus terrestris) with collected pollen visible on hind leg.

Floral traits, such as corolla color, flower shape, size and scent, appear to have evolved primarily for the purpose of attracting pollinators and many pollinators have learned to associate these floral signals with the reward that is present there. As pollinators are essential in the process of pollen transfer (and therefore, reproductive success) of many angiosperms, visitation behavior will impose frequency-dependent selection on the flower morphs that they visit. If pollinators selectively visit a particular morph, this will cause this morph to increase in frequency, and may ultimately lead to the fixation of this phenotype, known as directional selection. Alternatively, if rare morphs are preferred, this should promote phenotypic diversity, known as balancing or stabilizing selection.

Interest in frequency-dependent selection dates back to the time of Charles Darwin, who predicted that insects should demonstrate flower constancy and puzzled over the occurrence of deceptive orchid species. This phenomenon received little attention until the 1970s when Donald Levin suggested that one of the most important factors determining pollinator visitation behavior is the floral trait's frequency in the population relative to other floral elements. Since this time, attention has focussed on understanding how obligately pollinated, unrewarding species can persist as they offer pollinators no incentive to visit. Much less research has been conducted on frequency-dependent foraging on rewarding species, but experiments using bumblebees have illustrated that frequency likely plays a role in reproductive success of flowering plants.

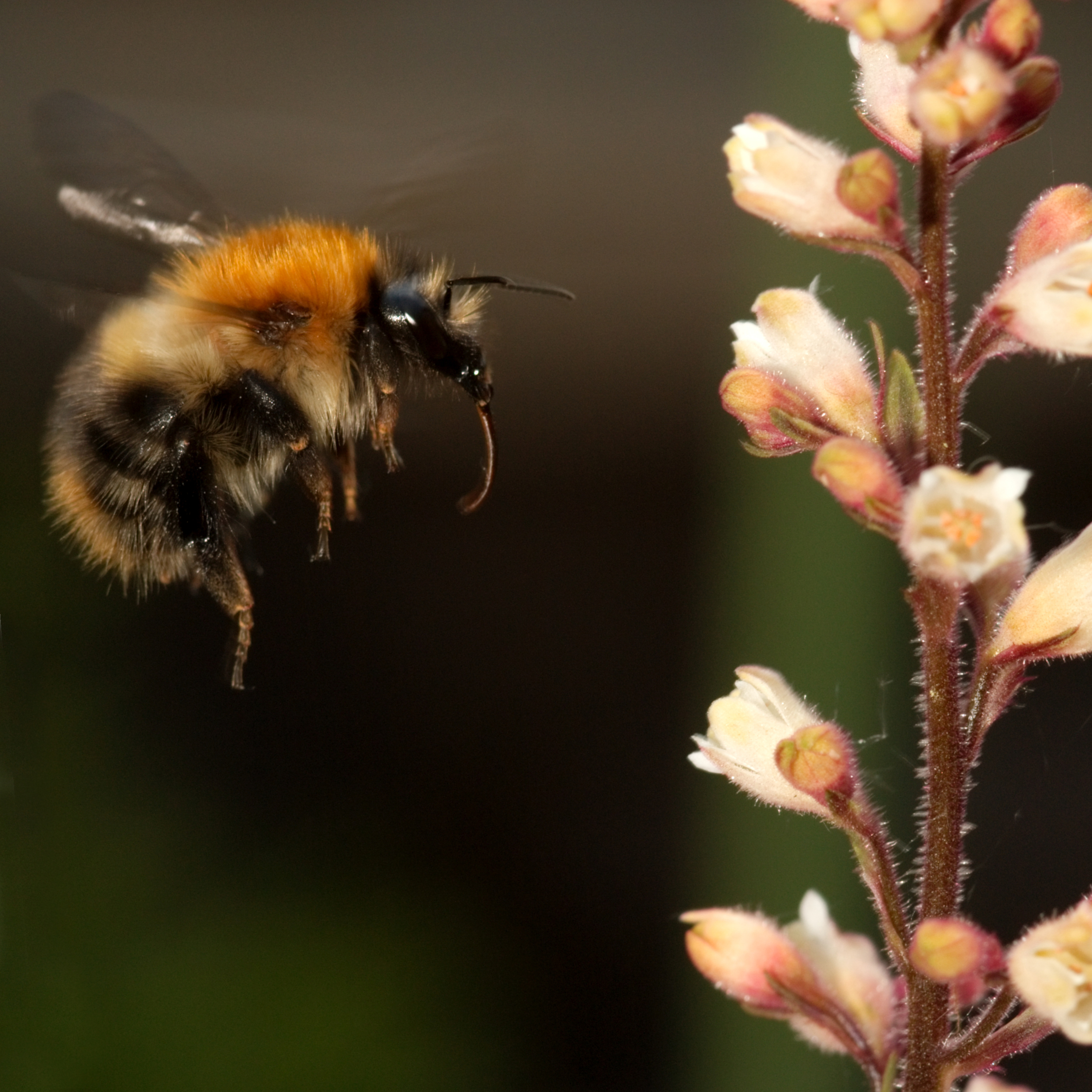
Bumblebee with tongue extracted about to visit a Heuchera plant for nectar.

== Experimental evidence ==
Researchers studying frequency-dependent visitation behavior seek to understand if pollinator preference is strong enough to induce fixation of traits or to maintain floral polymorphisms observed in natural populations. Laboratory experiments use artificial flowers to test how pollinator preference varies with frequency. Typical experiments use two or more colored discs or artificial flowers (to represent flower morphs) that are arranged in various patterns and frequencies. It is predicted that if pollinators do not exhibit frequency-dependent foraging, morph preference will not correlate with the relative frequency of that morph. Instead, this preference may depend on some frequency-independent quality, such as an innate attraction toward a certain color.

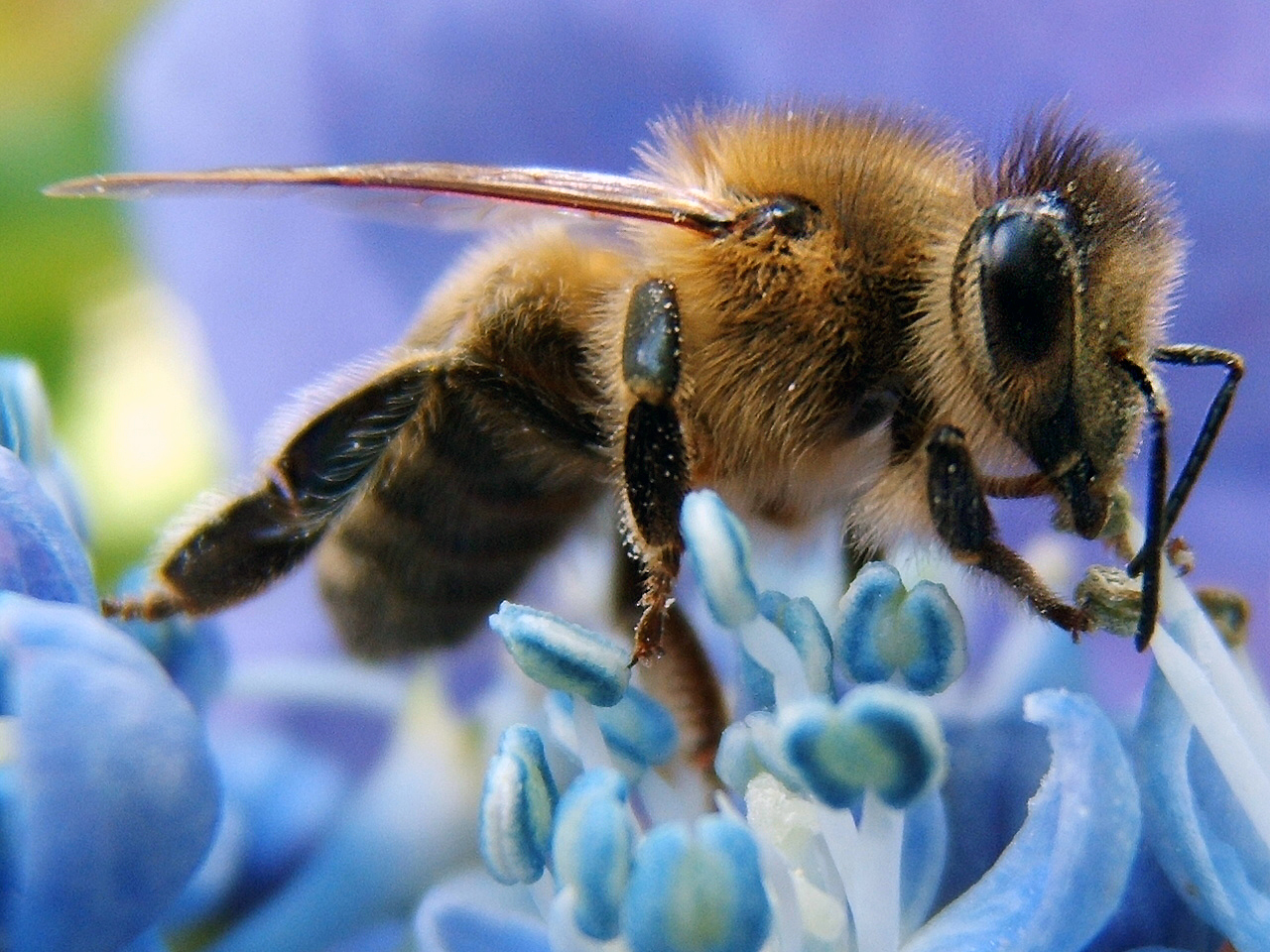
Honeybee on a blue flower.

=== Bumblebees ===
==== Laboratory experiments ====
Frequency-dependent foraging has most often been observed and studied in bumblebees (Bombus) as they tend to forage for long periods of time without becoming satiated, making them ideal experimental subjects. Simple experiments using two morphs have revealed that after visiting many flowers (more than 100) bumblebees tend to prefer to visit the common morph when rewards associated with both morphs are equal. This pattern is consistent for a variety of nectar concentrations. An exception to this pattern occurs when one morph contains variable amounts of nectar. This reward variability tends to cause the strength of the observed frequency dependence to decrease. However, when both rare and common morphs are unrewarding, bumblebees tend to reverse their behavioral pattern and demonstrate rare morph preference.

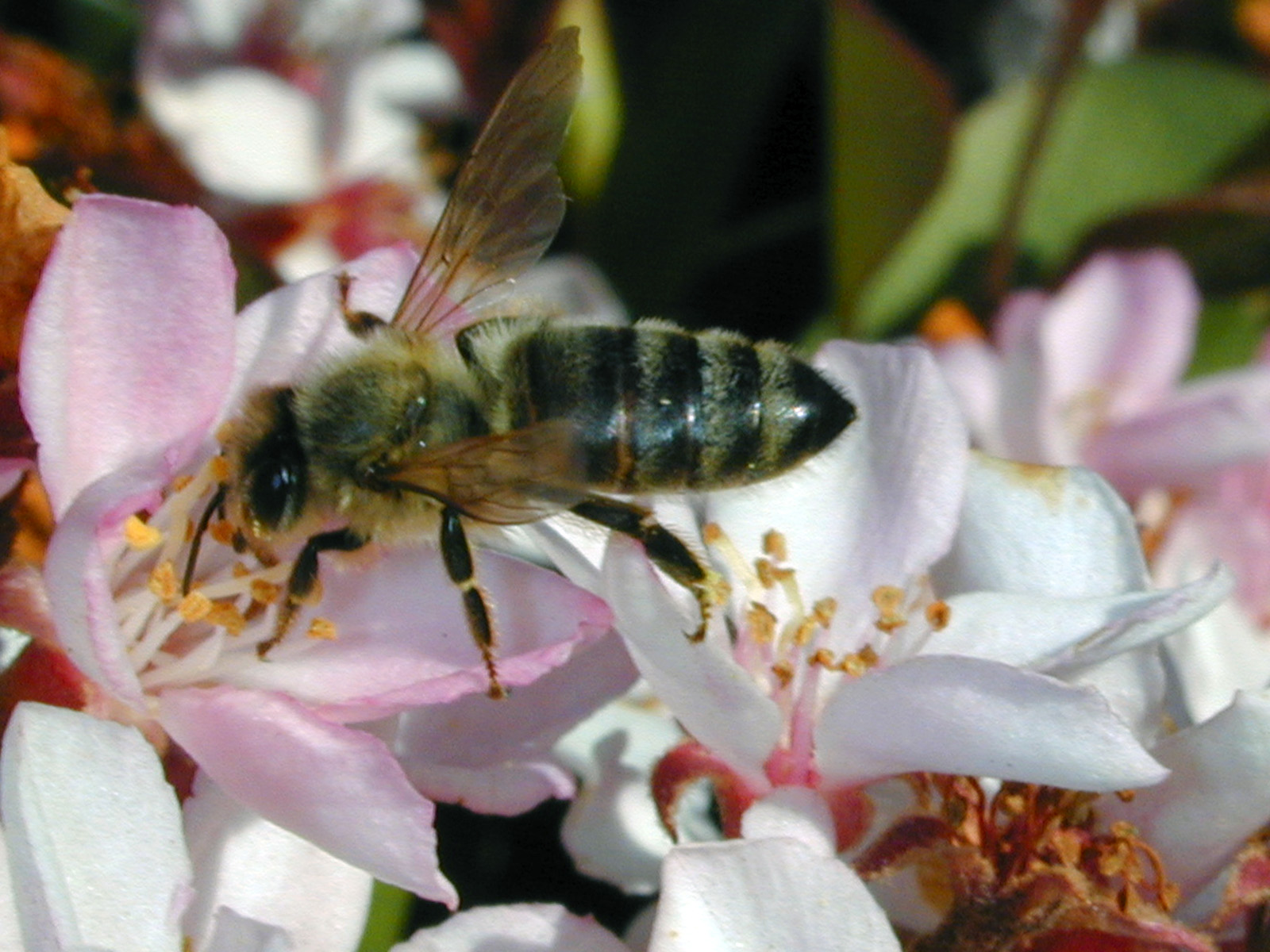
Corolla morphs may not be as distinctly colored in natural populations as they are in laboratory experiments.

Even though these experiments demonstrate that bumblebees forage in a frequency-dependent manner, the strength of this response can be asymmetric for different colors. For example, experiments using blue and yellow discs to represent corolla colors demonstrated that, although bumblebees preferentially foraged on the most common morph when rewards were present, the threshold for switching to the common morph was different for both colors. Bumblebees exhibit an innate preference for blue corollas, as this color is very conspicuous to bees against green-colored backgrounds. It was observed that in order for bees to switch from blue flowers to yellow, the yellow-to-blue ratio had to be much higher than the ratio of blue-to-yellow flowers that were required for the opposite switch. In other words, bees would forage on blue flowers until morphs of this colour reached relatively lower frequencies compared to yellow flowers. However, this preference for blue was not as pronounced when both morphs contained high levels of nectar. Therefore, frequency-dependent preferences must be considered along-with frequency-independent preferences to truly understand the visitation behavior of pollinators. Additionally, when density of equally rewarding color morphs were manipulated, bumblebees still preferred to forage on the common morphs, even at high densities.

==== Field experiments ====
Experiments conducted in the field have yielded mixed results. Some studies have demonstrated that bumblebees prefer the relatively common corolla color, but in other studies there did not appear to be any observable pattern of bee visitation behavior. This discrepancy between laboratory and field studies may be due to the fact that laboratory studies use highly contrasting corolla colors and it is likely that color polymorphisms in the wild are not this distinct, making frequency-dependence weaker in natural settings. Additionally, in natural populations multiple traits that are attractive to pollinators may be genetically correlated with one another (pleiotropy), so looking at pollinator response to a single trait in isolation may not be appropriate under these circumstances. Also, frequency-dependent foraging is not apparent until many flowers have been visited (more than 100). Therefore, considering morph frequency within localized patches of flowers in natural settings may not be sufficient. Instead, morph frequency may need to be calculated over large spatial ranges to determine the extent to which pollinators are foraging in a frequency-dependent manner.

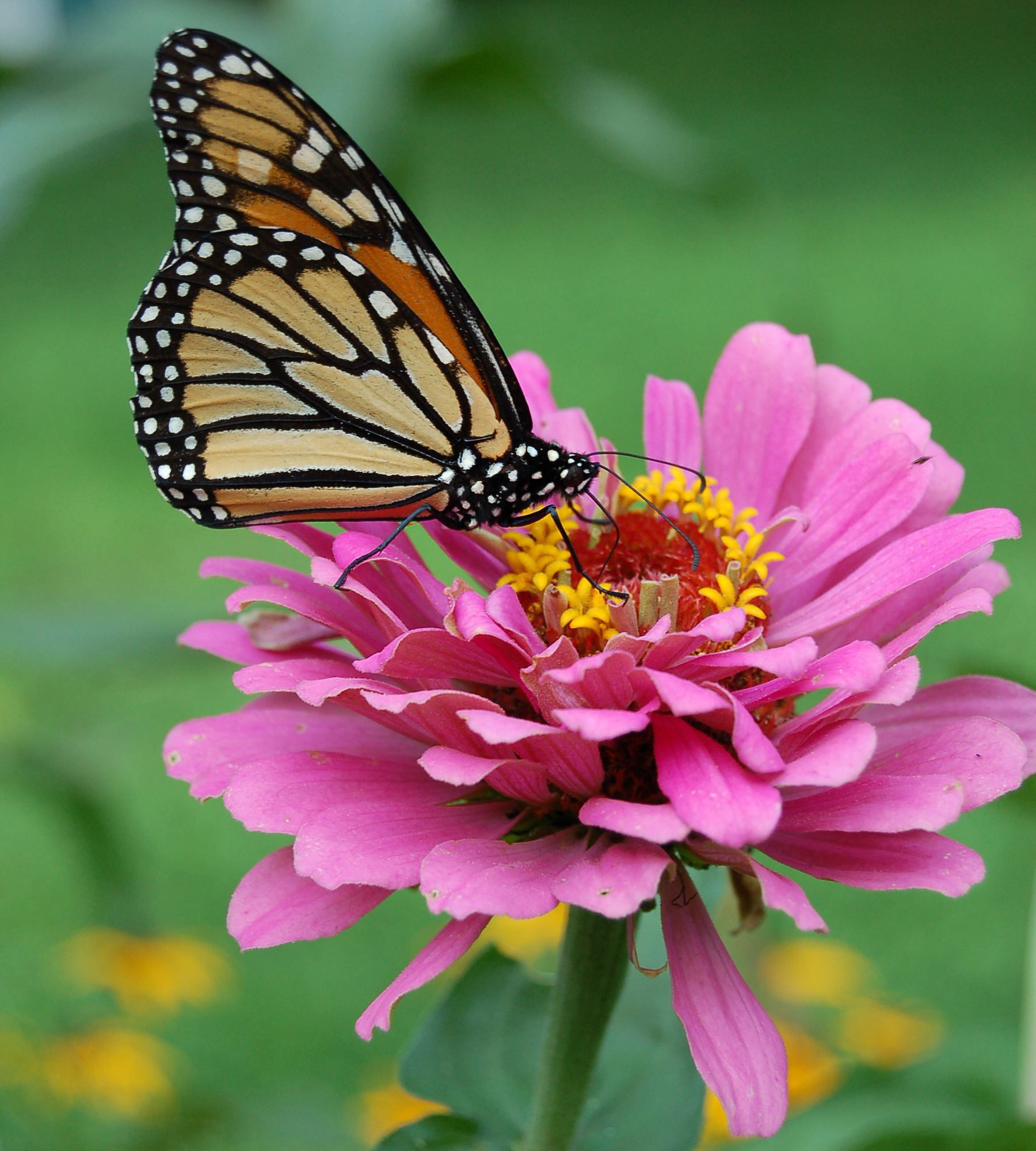
A monarch butterfly drinking nectar from a Zinnia flower.

=== Other insects ===
Although studies of frequency-dependent foraging in other pollinator groups seems to be rare, at least one study has demonstrated that butterflies prefer to visit common corolla shapes. This observation was based on reduced seed set of rare morphs in field studies.

== Mechanisms ==
=== Positive frequency-dependent foraging ===
Foraging on common morphs will be beneficial if these common morphs are associated with a higher reward than rare morphs. However, if rare morphs have similar nectar quality, skipping over these equally rewarding flowers appears to be inconsistent with optimal foraging theory. Several hypotheses have been proposed to suggest how this visitation pattern is maintained.

==== Search image hypothesis ====
It has been observed that predators tend to select the most common morph in a population or species. The search image hypothesis proposes that an individual's sensory system becomes better able to detect a specific prey phenotype after recent experience with that same phenotype. It is clear that plant-pollinator interactions differ from predator-prey relationships, as it is beneficial to both the plant and animal for the pollinator to locate the plant. However, it has been suggested that cognitive constraints on short-term memory capabilities may limit pollinators from identifying and handling more than one floral type at a time, making plant-pollinator relationships theoretically similar to predator-prey relationships in regards to the ability to identify food sources. Although plant traits that have evolved to attract pollinators are not cryptic, corolla colors can be more or less conspicuous with the background and pollinators that are more efficient at detecting a particular morph will minimize their search time. Studies have demonstrated that the degree of frequency-dependence increases with the number of flowers visited, which suggests this is a learned response that develops gradually.

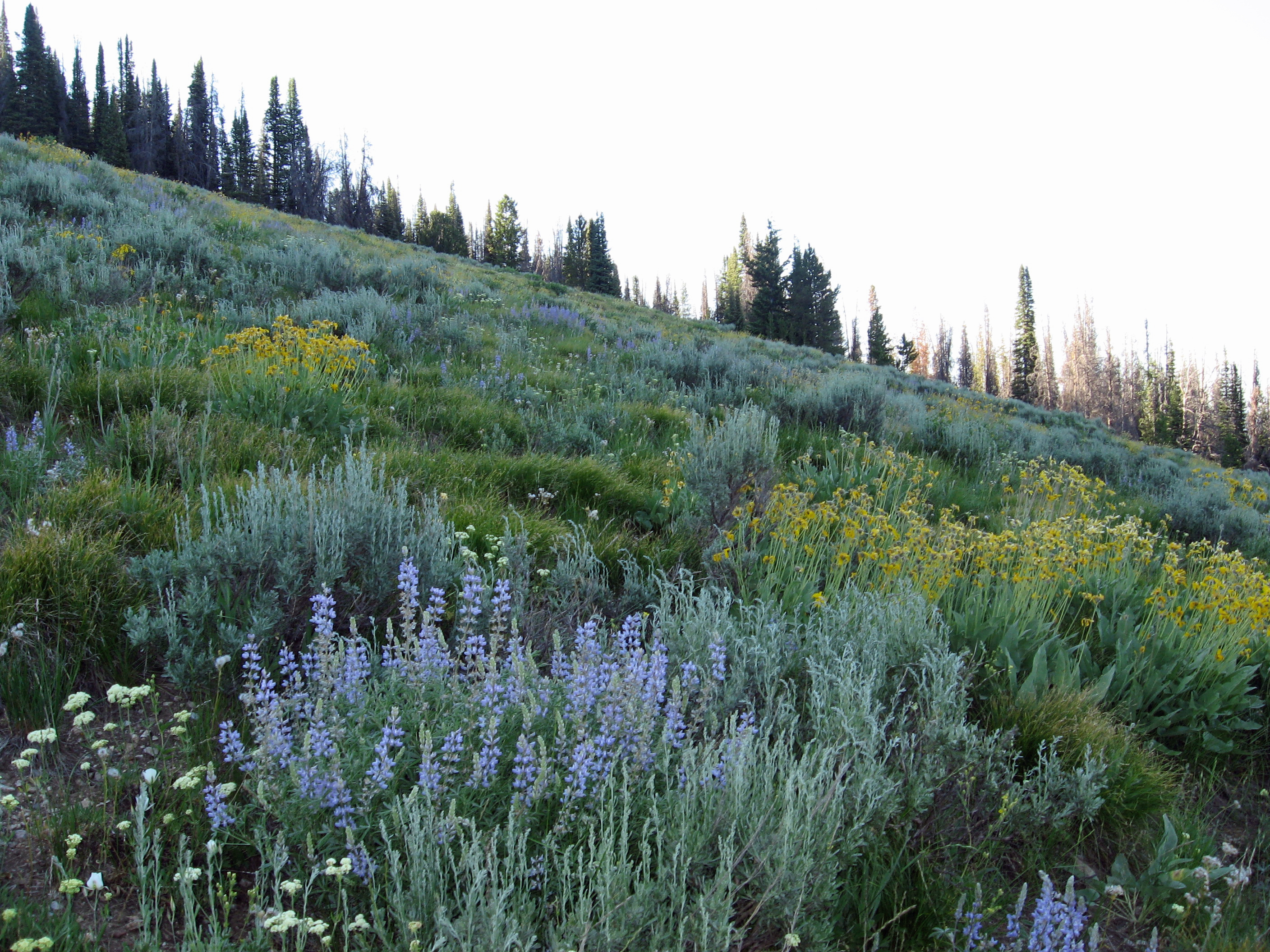
Flower morphs may differ in their relative conspicuousness against the background.

==== Search rate hypotheses ====
Alternative mechanisms, such as the optimal search rate hypothesis and the stare duration hypothesis both propose that there is a tradeoff between search time and the probability of detecting prey. It has been demonstrated that when both density and frequency were manipulated, the strength of the preference for the common morph does not weaken with increased overall density, even when colors that are not innately preferred are the common morph. These results are consistent with both of these search time hypotheses, as bees tend to decrease their speed travelling between flowers when density is high, and therefore, may be more efficient at recognizing less conspicuous yellow flowers at lower speeds.

==== Switching attention hypothesis ====
Studies on other organisms have provided evidence that foraging can occur in long runs, but this preference develops after only visiting a few morphs. When presented with two equally rewarding morphs, it has been demonstrated that an organism may select to exclusively forage on one morph for a variable amount of time, and then switch to the alternative morph and repetitively forage on this morph. Under this switching attention hypothesis, selectively foraging on the common morph can occur without invoking a learned response, as the probability of visiting a particular morph first increases as the relative frequency of that morph increases. In other words, it is likely pollinators will select common morphs first due to chance since they are more common and will continue to forage on these morphs during foraging bouts.

=== Negative frequency-dependent foraging ===
Pollinators appear to forage in a negative frequency-dependent manner when flowers do not provide nectar rewards, likely to avoid unrewarding morphs. This behaviour results in disassortative mating between different morph types. However, it seems likely that deceptive species would have low reproductive success as pollinators would learn to avoid areas where only unrewarding species are present.

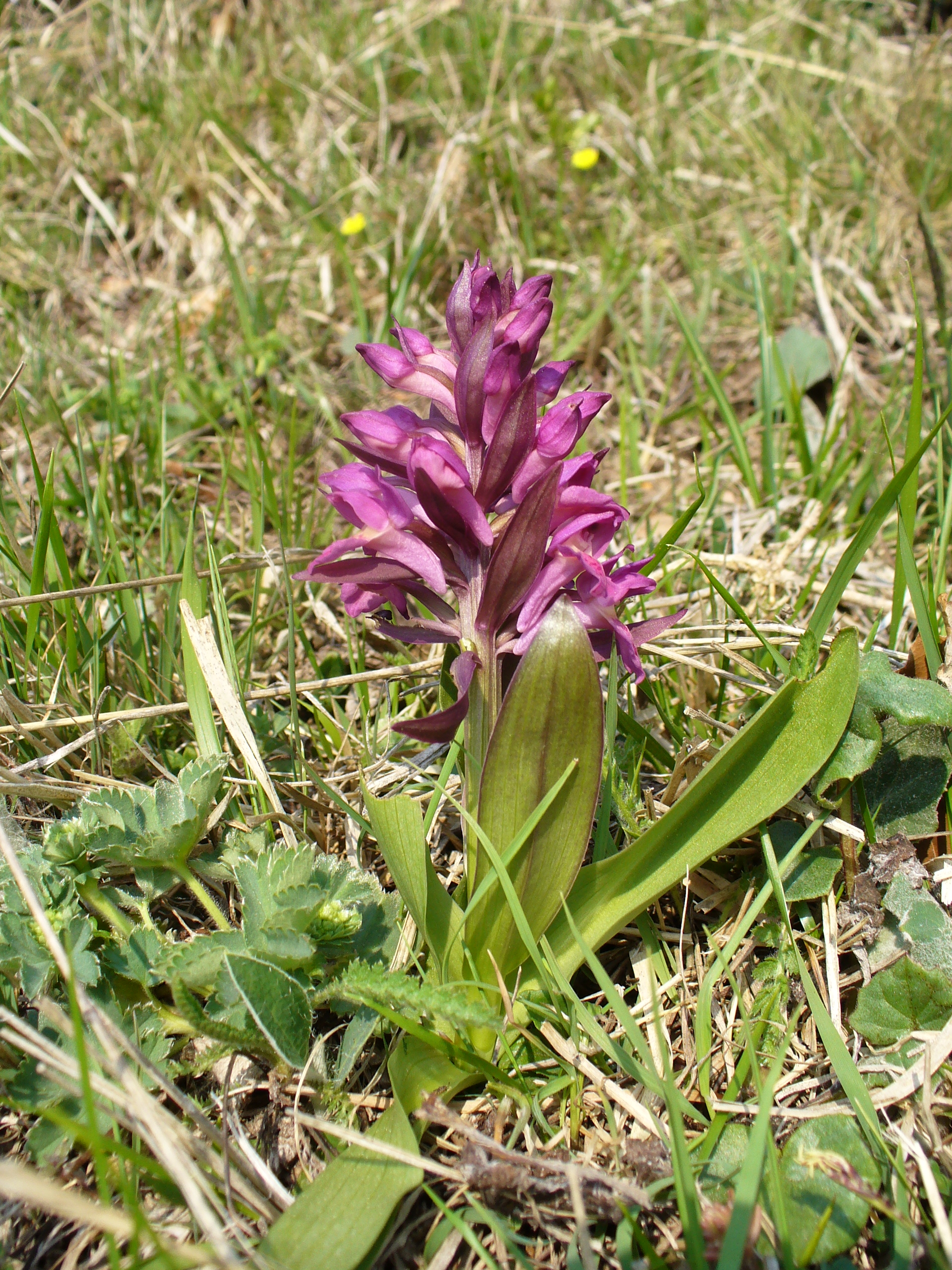
A deceptive orchid, Dactylorhiza sambucina, does not provide a nectar reward for its pollinators.

==== Naive pollinators ====
One hypothesis as to how unrewarding species can persist in the population is that they only receive visits from naive pollinators. As pollinators do not appear to be able to distinguish between rewarding and unrewarding flowers prior to landing, they need to make test visits so they can learn to avoid particular morph types. When a preferred rewarding morph type becomes locally depleted, pollinators may be initially attracted to unrewarding morphs if these morphs exploit signals that are innately attractive or closely mimic rewarding species. However, under this hypothesis, the pollinator should learn to associate this morph with no reward and consequently avoid it on future foraging bouts.

==== Negative frequency-dependent selection ====
A different hypothesis does not assume that only naive pollinators visit deceptive species. Instead, the negative reinforcement associated with visiting an unrewarding flower is assumed to be stored in short-term memory. This causes the pollinator to go to a different morph type on its next visit. In other words, if deceptive species were to occur at a low enough frequency that pollinators do not encounter them very often, it is unlikely they will have the opportunity to relocate this information to their long-term memory. Studies have shown that the number of flowers of an unrewarding morph type that are sampled depends on the frequency of those morphs within a population. For example, many species of obligately animal-pollinated, deceptive orchids that co-occur with rewarding flowers are only reproductively successful when they occur at low frequencies. These two hypotheses are not mutually exclusive, in that morph populations that are visited by naive pollinators are also likely to be found at low frequencies relative to rewarding morphs.

== Implications ==
Regardless of the mechanism, pollinators foraging in a frequency-dependent manner on common morphs will lead to assortative mating between similar phenotypes. Additionally, rare morphs may be at a disadvantage if reproductive success is correlated with number of pollinator visits, and this may lead to higher rates of selfing and ultimately inbreeding depression, in self-compatible plants. The potential for a decrease in genetic diversity due to assortative mating can have negative implications.

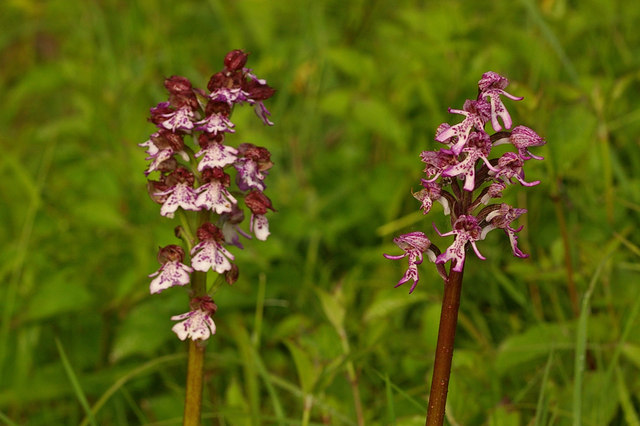
Lady orchid (left) and naturally occurring lady/monkey hybrid (right).

=== Climate change ===
In response to climate change, plants may begin to flower earlier in the season due to regional aridification and a rise in mean global temperature. However, reproductive success of flowering plants that are obligately pollinated ultimately depends on a corresponding change in the timing of pollinator visitors. The earliest bloomers of any species will be rare since the majority of conspecific plants have not yet flowered. Since many pollinators prefer to forage on common phenotypes, the flowers that bloom earliest in the season may be skipped. This may lead to a constraint on plant flowering evolution and the inability of flowering plants to adapt to changing environmental conditions.

=== Hybrid zones ===
Additionally, positive frequency-dependent foraging may help maintain hybrid zones between closely related species. Hybrid zones generally contain a wide variety of phenotypes, including novel or extremely rare morphs. Since certain pollinators tend to prefer common morphs, there is a low probability that they will visit rare morphs in the hybrid zone, thus keeping gene flow between species relatively low.

== See also ==
- Flower constancy
- Pollination
- Frequency-dependent selection
