= Apostatic =

Apostatic may refer to:

- Apostatic selection, the selection by predators consuming abundantly occurring prey types
- Apostasy, the formal renunciation of one's religion
