= Prey switching =

Ecological concept

Prey switching is frequency-dependent predation, where the predator preferentially consumes the most common type of prey. The phenomenon has also been described as apostatic selection, however the two terms are generally used to describe different parts of the same phenomenon. Apostatic selection has been used by authors looking at the differences between different genetic morphs. In comparison, prey switching has been used when describing the choice between different species.

== Definition ==
The term switching was first coined by the ecologist Murdoch in 1969 to describe the situation where a predator eats disproportionately more of the most common type of prey. Eight years earlier in 1962 the geneticst B. C. Clarke described a similar phenomenon and called it "apostatic selection". Since then the term prey switching has mainly been used by ecologists, while apostatic selection has been used by geneticists, and because of this they have been used to describe different aspects of frequency-dependent selection.

One of the ways prey switching has been identified and defined is when a predator's preference for a particular type of prey increases as the prey increase in abundance. The result is a strong preference for prey which are common in the environment and a weak preference for prey which are rare. The definition of preference will therefore impact the understanding of switching. The most common definition of preference is the relationship between the ratio of prey in the environment and the ratio of prey in a predator's diet. It has been independently proposed a number of times and is described by the equation:

P1/P2 = c (N1/N2); alternatively, c = (P1/P2)/(N1/N2)

where N1 and N2 are the abundance of prey types 1 and 2 in the environment and P1 and P2 are the abundances of the same prey types in the predator's diet. c is the preference for prey type 1. If the value of c increases over time with N1/N2, prey switching is presumed to occur. The opposite of prey switching is when a predator eats disproportionately more of the most rare prey than would be expected by chance. From the equation above this would occur when c (preference) decreases over time as N1/N2 (amount in the environment) increases. This opposite phenomenon has been called negative prey switching, or anti-apostatic selection when it refers to the choice between different morphs. Negative prey switching may occur when the more plentiful prey is harder to hunt or riskier.

Prey switching has been in the scientific literature since about 1960, but since his initial work Hassell has suggested that interest in prey switching has fallen since it is hard to demonstrate whether it has or is occurring.

== Mechanisms ==
The reason a consumer may switch from eating one resource, to eating another, is because it may increase an individual's foraging efficiency and therefore its inclusive fitness. It has been argued that frequency-dependent predation is predicted from optimal foraging theory. In particular the contingency model predicts that in some circumstances the most profitable resource should be eaten at the expense of the less profitable resources, and that this decision is based on the absolute density of the most profitable type of resource. However frequency-dependent predation can occur even when the absolute density of the most profitable resource remains constant. These ultimate mechanisms help to demonstrate how prey switching and apostatic selection fit into overarching ecological theory. In addition there are proximate mechanisms which may account for why an individual preferentially feeds on the most abundant type of prey.

The location and timing of when a consumer feeds can account for switching behaviour. In experiments with Guppies the switching behaviour displayed was due to the choice of patch. Likewise the switching behaviour of stoneflies was due to the time they were active. The formation of a search image may also lead to the consumer switching which prey it eats. Real suggests that a mechanism similar to search image may account for the switching behaviour displayed by Bombus pensylvanicus, however they are reluctant to use the term search image, instead suggesting some kind of perceptual constraint. Prey switching may also occur if the consumer becomes more efficient at capturing the most common type of prey, for example increased practice at capturing the most common prey. This was found to be the case for Anax junius which fed on either mayfly nymphs or tubifex worms. From this Bergelson came up with the rule of thumb that consumers should "continue to pursue only those prey types you have successfully captured in the immediate past." Prey switching can alter the influence of predation on ecosystem function. For example, predators that switch between feeding on herbivores and detritivores can link green and brown food webs.

In general there have been a limited number of studies which have identified mechanisms responsible for prey switching behaviour. However it has been suggested that a consumers choice of location to feed may be the most important mechanism. Conversely, search image is controversial with disagreement over whether it actually occurs in nature, and if it does whether it is important.

== Outcomes ==
If a predator displays prey switching behavior it can have a large effect on the stability of the system, coexistence of prey species and ecosystem functioning and evolutionary diversification.

Prey switching can promote coexistence between prey species. For example, prey switching causes predation to be very low for prey which are rare, which can subsequently create prey refugia which will aid coexistence.

More generally than coexistence, prey switching has often been proposed to stabilise predator-prey dynamics.
