= Robert H. Tamarin =

American geneticist

Robert H. Tamarin is a biologist and author. He authored Principles of Genetics, a textbook in its seventh edition with McGraw-Hill Publishers.

His research interest focuses on evolutionary genetics. He has also developed radioisotope, electrophoretic and DNA fingerprinting techniques for use in the study of small mammal.

== Life and career ==
Tamarin obtained a Bachelor of Science degree from the City University of New York, Master of Science (M.S.) degree from Brooklyn College and a doctorate degree (Ph. D) from Indiana University.

He started his academic career at Boston University after he completed his postdoctoral fellowship at National Institutes of Health in the departments of genetics, University of Hawaii and a Ford Foundation postdoctoral fellowship in the Department of biology at Princeton University.

Tamarin is a well-recognized author of many scientific articles and textbooks such as Principles of Genetics. He is a contributor to Science Year, the World Book annual supplement.

== See also ==
- Frequency-dependent selection
