= Principles of genetics =

Principle of genetics
- Second edition (1964)
- Author: Robert H. Tamarin
- Language: English
- Genre: Textbook
- Publisher: McGraw-Hill Publishers
- Publication date: 1999
- Publication place: United Kingdom
- Media type: Print (hardback & paperback)
- Pages: 686
- ISBN: 978-0-470-90359-9
- OCLC: 263584177

Principles of Genetics is a genetics textbook authored by Robert H. Tamarin, an emeritus professor of biology, published by McGraw-Hill Publishers, London. The 7th edition of the book was published in October 2008.

== Description ==
The book has four sections. The first part, "Genetics and the Scientific Method", briefly reviews the history of genetics and the various methods used in genetic study. The second part focuses on Mendelian inheritance, the third deals with molecular genetics, and the last deals with quantitative genetics and evolutionary genetics.

== Review ==
The book received positive reviews from several editors and geneticists.
