= Polymorphism (biology) =

Species having two or more distinct forms

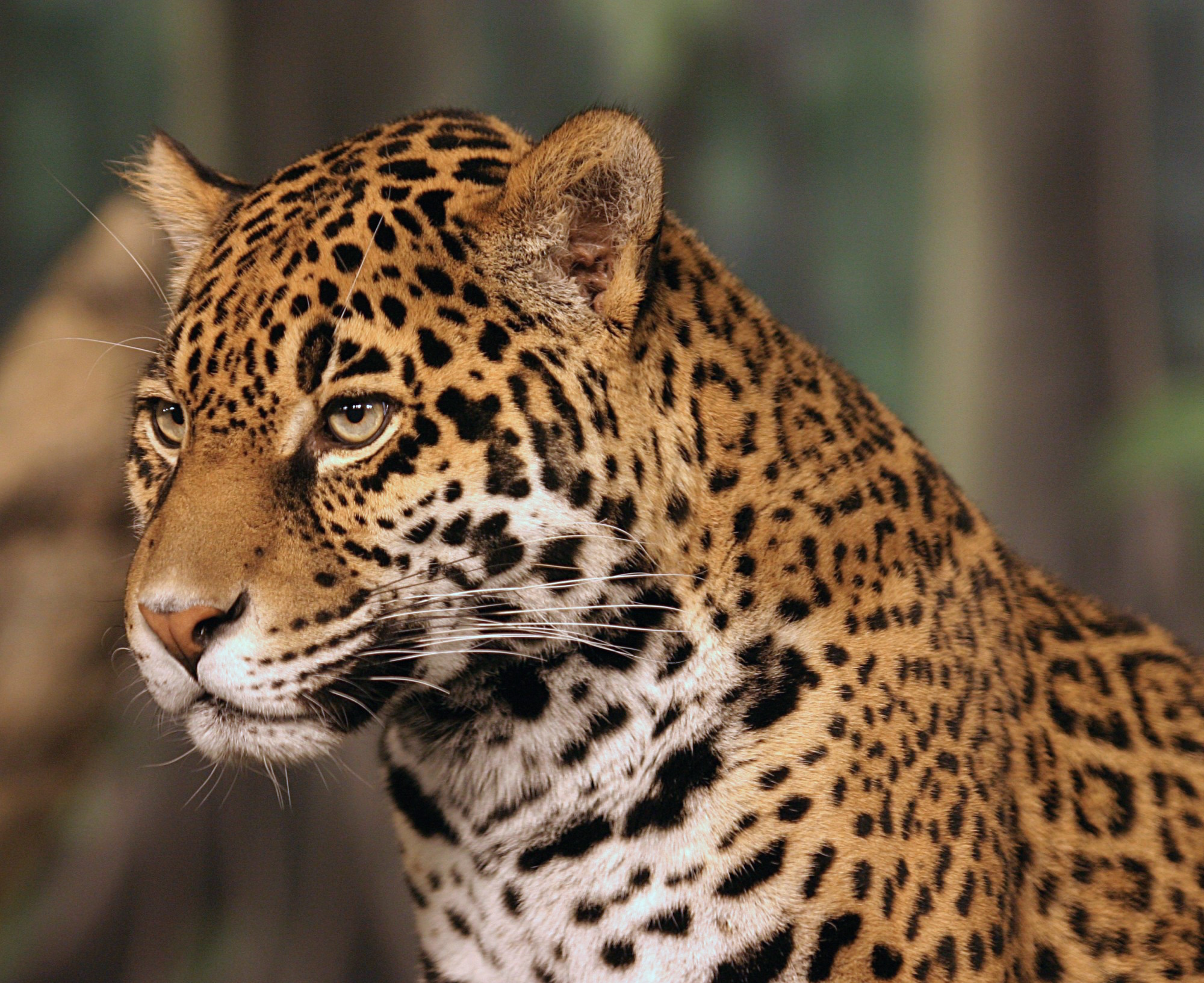
Light-morph jaguar

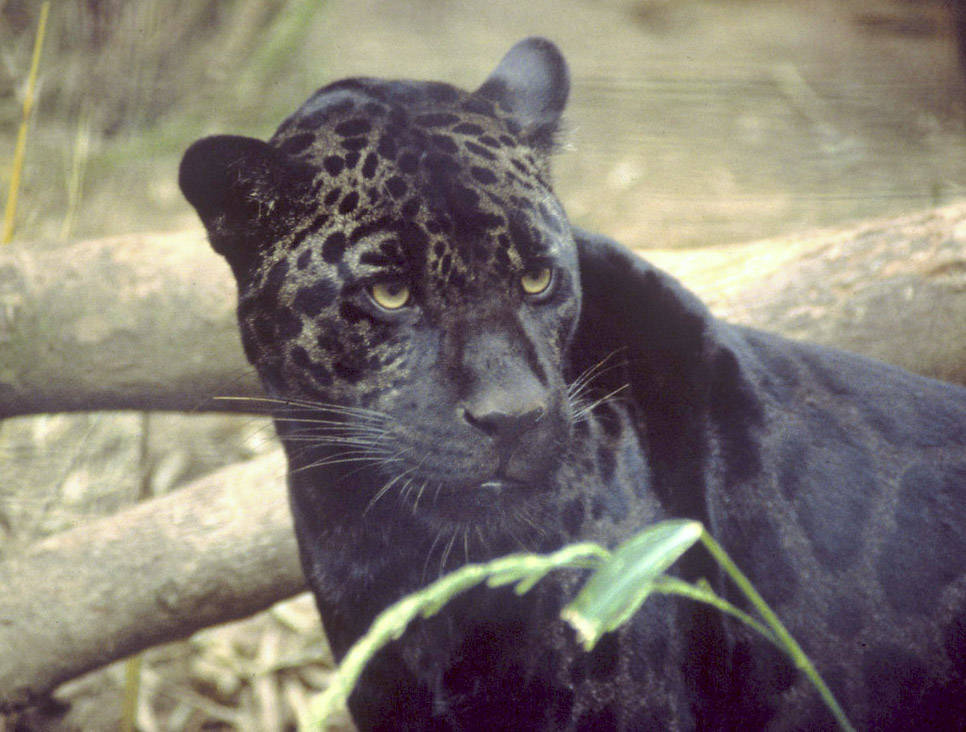
Dark-morph or melanistic jaguar (about 6% of the South American population)

In biology, polymorphism is the occurrence of two or more clearly different morphs or forms, also referred to as alternative phenotypes, in the population of a species. To be classified as such, morphs must occupy the same habitat at the same time and belong to a panmictic population (one with random mating).

Put simply, polymorphism is when there are two or more possibilities of a trait on a gene. For example, there is more than one possible trait in terms of a jaguar's skin colouring; they can be light morph or dark morph. Due to having more than one possible variation for this gene, it is termed 'polymorphism'. However, if the jaguar has only one possible trait for that skin colour, it would be termed 'monomorphic'.

The term polyphenism can be used to clarify that the different forms arise from the same genotype. Genetic polymorphism is a term used somewhat differently by geneticists and molecular biologists to describe certain mutations in the genotype, such as single nucleotide polymorphisms that may not always correspond to a phenotype, but always corresponds to a branch in the genetic tree. See below.

Polymorphism is common in nature; it is related to biodiversity, genetic variation, and adaptation. Polymorphism usually functions to retain a variety of forms in a population living in a varied environment. The most common example is sexual dimorphism, which occurs in many organisms. Other examples are mimetic forms of butterflies (see mimicry), and human hemoglobin and blood types.

According to the theory of evolution, polymorphism results from evolutionary processes, as does any aspect of a species. It is heritable and is modified by natural selection. In polyphenism, an individual's genetic makeup allows for different morphs, and the switch mechanism that determines which morph is shown is environmental. In genetic polymorphism, the genetic makeup determines the morph.

The term polymorphism also refers to the occurrence of structurally and functionally more than two different types of individuals, called zooids, within the same organism. It is a characteristic feature of cnidarians. For example, Obelia has feeding individuals, the gastrozooids; the individuals capable of asexual reproduction only, the gonozooids, blastostyles; and free-living or sexually reproducing individuals, the medusae.

Balanced polymorphism refers to the maintenance of different phenotypes in population.

== Terminology ==
Monomorphism means having only one form. Dimorphism means having two forms.

- Polymorphism does not cover characteristics showing continuous variation (such as weight), though this has a heritable component. Polymorphism deals with forms in which the variation is discrete (discontinuous) or strongly bimodal or polymodal.
- Morphs must occupy the same habitat at the same time; this excludes geographical races and seasonal forms. The use of the words "morph" or "polymorphism" for what is a visibly different geographical race or variant is common, but incorrect. The significance of geographical variation is that it may lead to allopatric speciation, whereas true polymorphism takes place in panmictic populations.
- The term was first used to describe visible forms, but it has been extended to include cryptic morphs, for instance blood types, which can be revealed by a test.
- Rare variations are not classified as polymorphisms, and mutations by themselves do not constitute polymorphisms. To qualify as a polymorphism, some kind of balance must exist between morphs underpinned by inheritance. The criterion is that the frequency of the least common morph is too high simply to be the result of new mutations or, as a rough guide, that it is greater than 1% (though that is far higher than any normal mutation rate for a single allele).

=== Nomenclature ===
Polymorphism crosses several discipline boundaries, including ecology, genetics, evolution theory, taxonomy, cytology, and biochemistry. Different disciplines may give the same concept different names, and different concepts may be given the same name. For example, there are the terms established in ecological genetics by E.B. Ford (1975), and for classical genetics by John Maynard Smith (1998). The shorter term morphism was preferred by the evolutionary biologist Julian Huxley (1955).

Various synonymous terms exist for the various polymorphic forms of an organism. The most common are morph and morpha, while a more formal term is morphotype. Form and phase are sometimes used, but are easily confused in zoology with, respectively, "form" in a population of animals, and "phase" as a color or other change in an organism due to environmental conditions (temperature, humidity, etc.). Phenotypic traits and characteristics are also possible descriptions, though that would imply just a limited aspect of the body.

In the taxonomic nomenclature of zoology, the word "morpha" plus a Latin name for the morph can be added to a binomial or trinomial name. However, this invites confusion with geographically variant ring species or subspecies, especially if polytypic. Morphs have no formal standing in the ICZN. In botanical taxonomy, the concept of morphs is represented with the terms "variety", "subvariety" and "form", which are formally regulated by the ICN. Horticulturists sometimes confuse this usage of "variety" both with cultivar ("variety" in viticultural usage, rice agriculture jargon, and informal gardening lingo) and with the legal concept "plant variety" (protection of a cultivar as a form of intellectual property).

== Mechanisms ==
Three mechanisms may cause polymorphism:

- Genetic polymorphism – where the phenotype of each individual is genetically determined
  - An example of this can be seen in the blue-tailed damselfly (Ischnura elegans)
- A conditional development strategy, where the phenotype of each individual is set by environmental cues
- A mixed development strategy, where the phenotype is randomly assigned during development

== Relative frequency ==
Endler's survey of natural selection gave an indication of the relative importance of polymorphisms among studies showing natural selection. The results, in summary: Number of species demonstrating natural selection: 141. Number showing quantitative traits: 56. Number showing polymorphic traits: 62. Number showing both Q and P traits: 23. This shows that polymorphisms are found to be at least as common as continuous variation in studies of natural selection, and hence just as likely to be part of the evolutionary process.

== Genetics ==
=== Genetic polymorphism ===
Since all polymorphism has a genetic basis, genetic polymorphism has a particular meaning:

- Genetic polymorphism is the simultaneous occurrence in the same locality of two or more discontinuous forms in such proportions that the rarest of them cannot be maintained just by recurrent mutation or immigration, originally defined by Ford (1940). The later definition by Cavalli-Sforza & Bodmer (1971) is currently used: "Genetic polymorphism is the occurrence in the same population of two or more alleles at one locus, each with appreciable frequency", where the minimum frequency is typically taken as 1%.

The definition has three parts: a) sympatry: one interbreeding population; b) discrete forms; and c) not maintained just by mutation.

In simple words, the term polymorphism was originally used to describe variations in shape and form that distinguish normal individuals within a species from each other. Presently, geneticists use the term genetic polymorphism to describe the functionally silent differences in DNA sequence between individuals that make each human genome unique.

Genetic polymorphism is actively and steadily maintained in populations by natural selection, in contrast to transient polymorphisms where a form is progressively replaced by another. By definition, genetic polymorphism relates to a balance or equilibrium between morphs. The mechanisms that conserve it are types of balancing selection.

=== Mechanisms of balancing selection ===
- Heterosis (or heterozygote advantage): "Heterosis: the heterozygote at a locus is fitter than either homozygote".
- Frequency dependent selection: The fitness of a particular phenotype is dependent on its frequency relative to other phenotypes in a given population. Example: prey switching, where rare morphs of prey are actually fitter due to predators concentrating on the more frequent morphs.
- Fitness varies in time and space. Fitness of a genotype may vary greatly between larval and adult stages, or between parts of a habitat range.
- Selection acts differently at different levels. The fitness of a genotype may depend on the fitness of other genotypes in the population: this covers many natural situations where the best thing to do (from the point of view of survival and reproduction) depends on what other members of the population are doing at the time.

=== Pleiotropism ===
Most genes have more than one effect on the phenotype of an organism (pleiotropism). Some of these effects may be visible, and others cryptic, so it is often important to look beyond the most obvious effects of a gene to identify other effects. Cases occur where a gene affects an unimportant visible characteristic, yet a change in fitness is recorded. In such cases, the gene's subsurface effects may be responsible for the change in fitness. Pleiotropism is posing continual challenges for many clinical dysmorphologists in their attempt to explain birth defects which affect one or more organ system, with only a single underlying causative agent. For many pleiotropic disorders, the connection between the genetic abnormality and its manifestations is neither apparent nor understood.

"If a neutral trait is pleiotropically linked to an advantageous one, it may emerge because of a process of natural selection. It was selected but this doesn't mean it is an adaptation. The reason is that, although it was selected, there was no selection for that trait."

=== Epistasis ===
Epistasis occurs when the expression of one gene is modified by another gene. For example, gene A only shows its effect when allele B1 (at another locus) is present, but not if it is absent. This is one of the ways in which two or more genes may combine to produce a coordinated change in more than one characteristic (for instance, in mimicry). Unlike the supergene, epistatic genes do not need to be closely linked or even on the same chromosome.

Both pleiotropism and epistasis show that a gene need not relate to a character in the simple manner that was once supposed.

=== The origin of supergenes ===
Although a polymorphism can be controlled by alleles at a single locus (e.g. human ABO blood groups), the more complex forms are controlled by supergenes consisting of several tightly linked genes on a single chromosome. Batesian mimicry in butterflies and heterostyly in angiosperms are good examples. There is a long-standing debate as to how this situation could have arisen, and the question is not yet resolved.

Whereas a gene family (several tightly linked genes performing similar or identical functions) arises by duplication of a single original gene, this is usually not the case with supergenes. In a supergene some of the constituent genes have quite distinct functions, so they must have come together under selection. This process might involve suppression of crossing-over, translocation of chromosome fragments and possibly occasional cistron duplication. That crossing-over can be suppressed by selection has been known for many years.

Debate has centered round the question of whether the component genes in a super-gene could have started off on separate chromosomes, with subsequent reorganization, or if it is necessary for them to start on the same chromosome. Originally, it was held that chromosome rearrangement would play an important role. This explanation was accepted by E. B. Ford and incorporated into his accounts of ecological genetics.

However, many believe it more likely that the genes start on the same chromosome. They argue that supergenes arose in situ. This is known as Turner's sieve hypothesis. John Maynard Smith agreed with this view in his authoritative textbook, but the question is still not definitively settled.

== Ecology ==
Selection, whether natural or artificial, changes the frequency of morphs within a population; this occurs when morphs reproduce with different degrees of success. A genetic (or balanced) polymorphism usually persists over many generations, maintained by two or more opposed and powerful selection pressures. Diver (1929) found banding morphs in Cepaea nemoralis could be seen in prefossil shells going back to the Mesolithic Holocene. Non-human apes have similar blood groups to humans; this strongly suggests that this kind of polymorphism is ancient, at least as far back as the last common ancestor of the apes and man, and possibly even further.

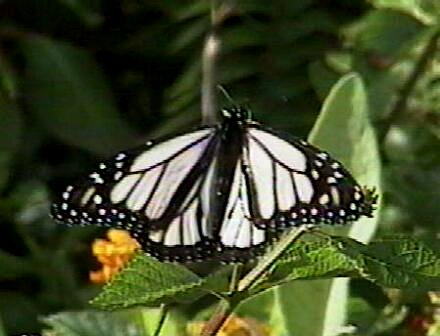
The white morph of the monarch in Hawaii is partly a result of apostatic selection.

The relative proportions of the morphs may vary; the actual values are determined by the effective fitness of the morphs at a particular time and place. The mechanism of heterozygote advantage assures the population of some alternative alleles at the locus or loci involved. Only if competing selection disappears will an allele disappear. However, heterozygote advantage is not the only way a polymorphism can be maintained. Apostatic selection, whereby a predator consumes a common morph whilst overlooking rarer morphs is possible and does occur. This would tend to preserve rarer morphs from extinction.

Polymorphism is strongly tied to the adaptation of a species to its environment, which may vary in colour, food supply, and predation and in many other ways including sexual harassment avoidance. Polymorphism is one good way the opportunities get to be used; it has survival value, and the selection of modifier genes may reinforce the polymorphism. In addition, polymorphism seems to be associated with a higher rate of speciation.

=== Polymorphism and niche diversity ===
G. Evelyn Hutchinson, a founder of niche research, commented "It is very likely from an ecological point of view that all species, or at least all common species, consist of populations adapted to more than one niche". He gave as examples sexual size dimorphism and mimicry. In many cases where the male is short-lived and smaller than the female, he does not compete with her during her late pre-adult and adult life. Size difference may permit both sexes to exploit different niches. In elaborate cases of mimicry, such as the African butterfly Papilio dardanus, female morphs mimic a range of distasteful models called Batesian mimicry, often in the same region. The fitness of each type of mimic decreases as it becomes more common, so the polymorphism is maintained by frequency-dependent selection. Thus the efficiency of the mimicry is maintained in a much increased total population. However it can exist within one gender.

Female-limited polymorphism and sexual assault avoidance

Female-limited polymorphism in Papilio dardanus can be described as an outcome of sexual conflict. Cook et al. (1994) argued that the male-like phenotype in some females in P. dardanus population on Pemba Island, Tanzania functions to avoid detection from a mate-searching male. The researchers found that male mate preference is controlled by frequency-dependent selection, which means that the rare morph suffers less from mating attempt than the common morph. The reasons why females try to avoid male sexual harassment are that male mating attempt can reduce female fitness in many ways such as fecundity and longevity.

=== The switch ===
The mechanism which decides which of several morphs an individual displays is called the switch. This switch may be genetic, or it may be environmental. Taking sex determination as the example, in humans the determination is genetic, by the XY sex-determination system. In Hymenoptera (ants, bees and wasps), sex determination is by haplo-diploidy: the females are all diploid, the males are haploid. However, in some animals an environmental trigger determines the sex: alligators are a famous case in point. Polymorphism with an environmental trigger is called polyphenism.

The polyphenic system does have a degree of environmental flexibility not present in the genetic polymorphism. However, such environmental triggers are the less common of the two methods.

=== Investigative methods ===
Investigation of polymorphism requires use of both field and laboratory techniques. In the field:

- detailed survey of occurrence, habits and predation
- selection of an ecological area or areas, with well-defined boundaries
- capture, mark, release, recapture data
- relative numbers and distribution of morphs
- estimation of population sizes

And in the laboratory:

- genetic data from crosses
- population cages
- chromosome cytology if possible
- use of chromatography, biochemistry or similar techniques if morphs are cryptic

Without proper field-work, the significance of the polymorphism to the species is uncertain and without laboratory breeding the genetic basis is obscure. Even with insects, the work may take many years; examples of Batesian mimicry noted in the nineteenth century are still being researched.

== Relevance for evolutionary theory ==
Polymorphism was crucial to research in ecological genetics by E. B. Ford and his co-workers from the mid-1920s to the 1970s (similar work continues today, especially on mimicry). The results had a considerable effect on the mid-century evolutionary synthesis, and on present evolutionary theory. The work started at a time when natural selection was largely discounted as the leading mechanism for evolution, continued through the middle period when Sewall Wright's ideas on drift were prominent, to the last quarter of the 20th century when ideas such as Kimura's neutral theory of molecular evolution was given much attention. The significance of the work on ecological genetics is that it has shown how important selection is in the evolution of natural populations, and that selection is a much stronger force than was envisaged even by those population geneticists who believed in its importance, such as Haldane and Fisher.

In just a couple of decades the work of Fisher, Ford, Arthur Cain, Philip Sheppard and Cyril Clarke promoted natural selection as the primary explanation of variation in natural populations, instead of genetic drift. Evidence can be seen in Mayr's famous book Animal Species and Evolution, and Ford's Ecological Genetics. Similar shifts in emphasis can be seen in most of the other participants in the evolutionary synthesis, such as Stebbins and Dobzhansky, though the latter was slow to change.

Kimura drew a distinction between molecular evolution, which he saw as dominated by selectively neutral mutations, and phenotypic characters, probably dominated by natural selection rather than drift.

== See also ==
- Fondation Jean Dausset-CEPH
- Single-nucleotide polymorphism (SNP)
