= Exalbidion =

Scientific classification
- Kingdom: Animalia
- Phylum: Arthropoda
- Subphylum: Chelicerata
- Class: Arachnida
- Order: Araneae
- Infraorder: Araneomorphae
- Family: Theridiidae
- Genus: Exalbidion; Wunderlich, 1995

Type species
- E. sexmaculatum (Keyserling, 1884)

Species
- 6, see text

Genus of spiders

Exalbidion is a genus of comb-footed spiders that was first described by J. Wunderlich in 1995.

== Species ==
As of May 2020 it contains six species, found in the Caribbean and from Mexico to Brazil:

- Exalbidion barroanum (Levi, 1959) – Panama, Ecuador
- Exalbidion dotanum (Banks, 1914) – Mexico to Panama
- Exalbidion fungosum (Keyserling, 1886) – Venezuela, Ecuador, Peru, Brazil, Argentina
- Exalbidion pallisterorum (Levi, 1959) – Mexico
- Exalbidion rufipunctum (Levi, 1959) – Mexico, Panama, Ecuador
- Exalbidion sexmaculatum (Keyserling, 1884) (type) – Guatemala, Caribbean to Brazil

In synonymy:

- E. tungurahua = Exalbidion fungosum (Keyserling, 1886)
