= Apostatic selection =

Process in evolutionary theory

Apostatic selection is a form of negative frequency-dependent selection. It describes the survival of individual prey animals that are different (through mutation) from their species in a way that makes it more likely for them to be ignored by their predators. It operates on polymorphic species, species which have different forms. In apostatic selection, the common forms of a species are preyed on more than the rarer forms, giving the rare forms a selective advantage in the population. It has also been discussed that apostatic selection acts to stabilize prey polymorphisms.

The term "apostatic selection" was introduced in 1962 by Bryan Clarke in reference to predation on polymorphic grove snails and since then it has been used as a synonym for negative frequency-dependent selection. The behavioural basis of apostatic selection was initially neglected, but was eventually established by A.B Bond.

Apostatic selection can also apply to the predator if the predator has various morphs. There are multiple concepts that are closely linked with apostatic selection. One is the idea of prey switching, which is another term used to look at a different aspect of the same phenomenon, as well as the concept of a search image. Search images are relevant to apostatic selection as it is how a predator is able to detect an organism as a possible prey. Apostatic selection is important in evolution because it can sustain a stable equilibrium of morph frequencies, and hence maintains large amounts of genetic diversity in natural populations.

However, that a rare morph being present in a population does not always mean that apostatic selection will occur, as the rare morph could be targeted at a higher rate. From a predator's view, being able to select for rare morphs actually increases the predator's own fitness.

== Prey switching ==
In prey switching, predators switch from primary prey to an alternative food source for various reasons. This is related to apostatic selection because when a rare morph is being selected for, it is going to increase in abundance in a specific population until it becomes recognized by a predator. Prey switching, therefore, seems to be a result of apostatic selection. Prey switching is related to prey preference as well as the abundance of the prey.

== Effects on populations ==
It has also been determined that apostatic selection causes stabilization of prey polymorphisms due to the limitations of predators' behaviour. Since the common prey type is more abundant, they should be able to produce more offspring and grow exponentially, at a faster rate then those with the rare morph since they are in much smaller numbers. However, due to the fact that the common morph is preyed upon more frequently, it diminishes their expected rate of reproduction, thus maintaining the population in stable amounts of common and rare morphs. Essentially, unless an environmental change or an evolutionary change in predator or prey occurs, a stable equilibrium is produced.

== Search image ==
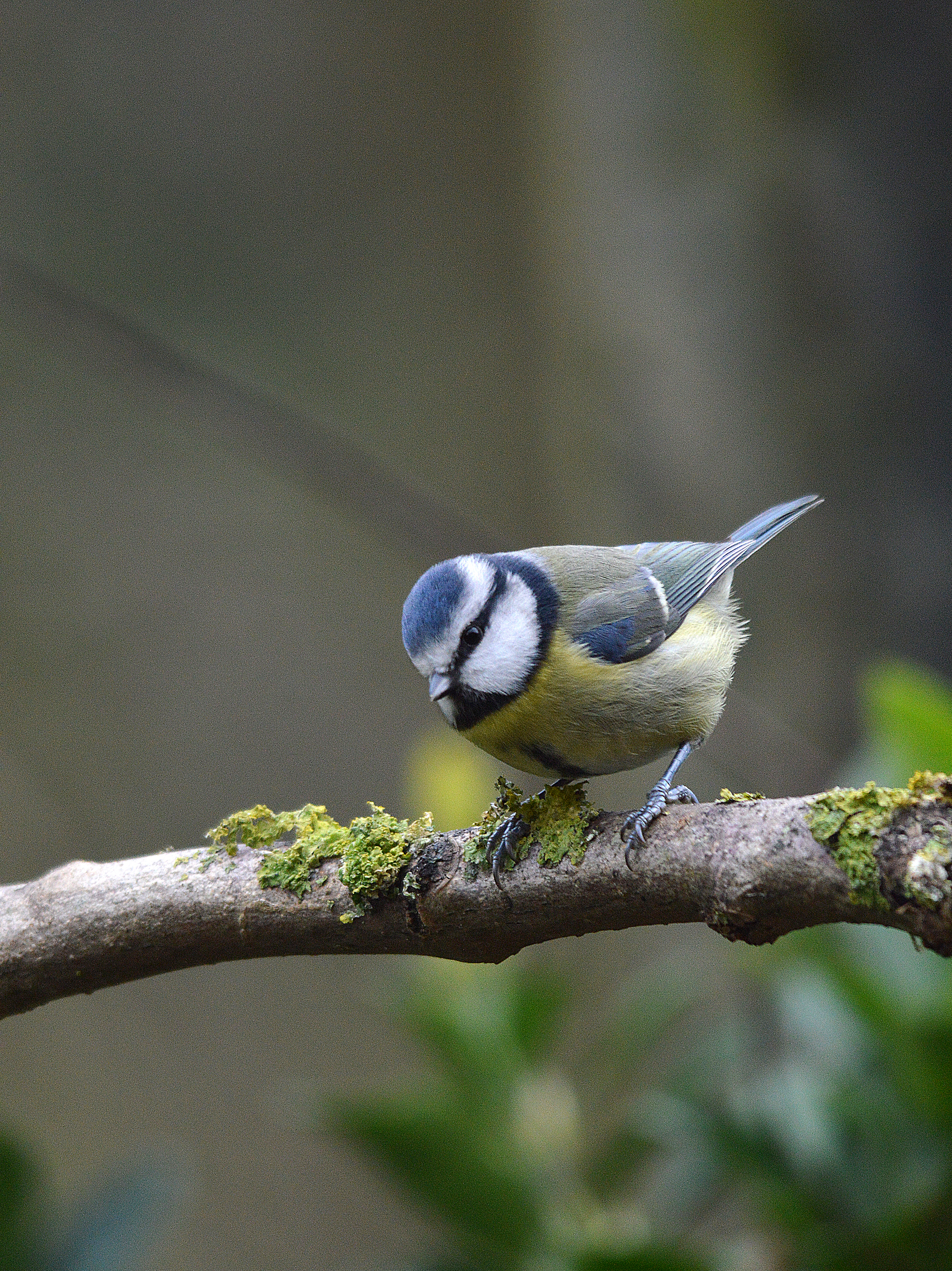
Blue tit searches for insect prey using a search image, leaving scarcer types of prey untouched.

A search image is what an individual uses in order to detect their prey. For the predator to detect something as prey, it must fit their criteria. The rare morph of a species may not fit the search image, and thus not be seen as prey. This gives the rare morphs an advantage, as it takes time for the predator to learn a new search image. Search image shift require multiple encounters with the new form of prey, and since a rare morph is typically not encountered multiple times, especially in a row, the prey is left undetected. An example of this is how a Blue tit searches for insect prey using a search image, leaving scarcer types of prey untouched. Predatory birds such as insect-eating tits (Parus) sometimes look only for a single cryptic type of prey even though there are other equally palatable cryptic prey present at lower density. Luuk Tinbergen proposed that this was because the birds formed a search image, a typical image of a prey that a predator can remember and use to spot prey when that image is common. Having a search image can be beneficial because it increases proficiency of a predator in finding a common morph type.

== Hypothesis for polymorphism ==
Apostatic selection serves as a hypothesis for the persistence of polymorphism in a population because of the variation it maintains in prey. Apostatic selection has been referred to as "selection for variation in its own sake". It has been used as an explanation for many types of polymorphism in various species, including diversity in tropical insects. The selective pressure for tropical insects to look as distinct as possible is high because the insects that appear to have the lowest density in a population are the ones that are preyed on the least.

== Environmental mechanisms ==
In order for apostatic selection to occur, and for the rare morph to have an advantage, a variety of criteria need to be met. First, there needs to be polymorphism present. In addition, the prey cannot be present in equal proportions, since then there would not be a benefit to being able to detect either one. This is related to frequency-dependent predation, where as the predator obtains the greatest advantage from having a search image for the most common type of prey. This causes the most common form of the prey to be the most vulnerable. Changes in prey detection by predators do occur, but the speed in which they occur and the flexibility of a predator's search image depend on the environment.

If the frequency of the different prey types continuously changes, the predator may not be able to change its behavior at a rate that will provide an advantage. In these situations, the predators who are able to change their search image rapidly or have a flexible search image are able to survive. In relation to apostatic selection, rapid changes in prey frequencies can decrease the advantage of the rare morph if their predators have a broad search image or are able to rapidly change their search image. However, rapid changes in polymorphism frequencies can also be an advantage to the prey with the rare morph. Since long periods of time are generally required for natural selection to act on predators, the degree of flexibility in their search image may not be able to be changed over a short time frame. Therefore, quickly arising rare morphs are favored by apostatic selection if the predators are not able to change their behavior and search image in a short time frame. Thus, this is a biological process that is victim to evolutionary time delay.

Apostatic selection is strongest in environments in which prey with the rare morphism match their background.

== Behavioural basis of apostatic selection ==
It has been suggested that in frequency-dependent predation, the number of encounters with the prey shapes the predator's ability to detect prey. This is based on the assumption that when the predator is learning foraging behaviour, it is going to obtain the common form of prey most frequently. Since the predator learns from what is most frequently captured, the most common morph is what is identified as prey. Foraging behaviour is shaped by the learned preference, thus causing apostatic selection and conferring a fitness benefit on the rare prey morphs. From this, it was concluded that search image formation and adaption is the mechanism that causes the most common prey type to be most easily distinguished from its environment, and thus be eaten more frequently than rarer types.

== Experimental evidence ==
Various types of experiments have been done to look into apostatic selection. Some involve artificial prey because it is easier to control external variables in a simulated environment, though using wild specimens increases the study's external validity. Often a computer screen simulation program is used on animals, such as birds of prey, to detect prey selection. Another type looks into how apostatic selection can act on the predator as well as the prey, as predator plumage polymorphism can also be influenced by apostatic selection. They hypothesized that a mutant predator morph will become more abundant in a population due to apostatic selection because the prey will not be able to recognize it as often as the common predator morph. Apostatic selection has been observed in both humans and animals, proving that it is not exclusive to lower organisms, and the cognition it requires is applicable to all organisms which display learning. Though a lot of this work has been experimental and lab controlled, there are some examples of it happening in both wild specimens and in the natural habitat of the species.

In hawks, almost all polymorphism is found on their ventral side. It allows for less common coloration to be favored since it will be recognized the least. Polymorphism is established by foraging strategies, creating opportunities for apostatic selection. Because of the different morphs and the varying selection on them, prey perception bias maintains prey polymorphism due to apostatic selection.

Apostatic selection can be reflected in Batesian mimicry. Aposematism and apostatic selection is used to explain defensive signaling like Batesian mimicry in certain species. A paper by Pfenning et al., 2006 looks into this concept. In allopatric situations, situations where separate species overlap geographically, mimic phenotypes have high fitness and are selected for when their model is present, but when it is absent, they suffer intense predation. In Pfenning's article it was suggested that this is caused by apostatic selection because strength of selection is higher on the mimics that have their original model present.

In Batesian mimicry, if the mimic is less common than the model, then the rare mimic phenotype is selected for because the predator has continued reinforcement that the prey is harmful or unpalatable. As the mimic becomes more common than the model, the situation reverses and the mimic is preyed upon more often. Therefore, dishonest signals in prey can be selected for or against depending on predation pressure.

An example of apostatic selection by birds was observed by Allen and Clarke (1968) in ground-dwelling passerines when they presented wild birds in their natural habitat with artificial, dimorphic prey. The two colors of prey were presented in 9:1 ratios, and then the prey were switched so both colors had an opportunity to be over or underrepresented. In all four of the passerine species that were observed, the more common morph of the artificial prey was consumed more frequently regardless of its color. This study also had a second component in which they allowed the birds to become familiar with one color of the prey, and then presented the dimorphic prey in equal amounts. In this case, the passerines consumed more of the prey that they were accustomed too. This is consistent with the idea that the search image influences apostatic selection: the familiar form that has been encountered more frequently is the preferred prey.

Apostatic selection has also been studied in cichlid fish, which presents a rare polymorphism: the gold ('Midas') colour morph. Torres-Dowall et al. (2017) discussed how apostatic selection is a plausible mechanism for the maintenance of this Midas morph. They concluded that the rare morph is established by a difference in the predator's probability of detecting the Midas morph. One limitation of this study was that the morphs in the wild were not able to be manipulated.

== See also ==
- Frequency-dependent selection
- Polymorphism (biology)
