= Prey detection =

Prey detection is the process by which predators are able to detect and locate their prey via sensory signals. This article treats predation in its broadest sense, i.e. where one organism eats another.

== Evolutionary struggle and prey defenses ==
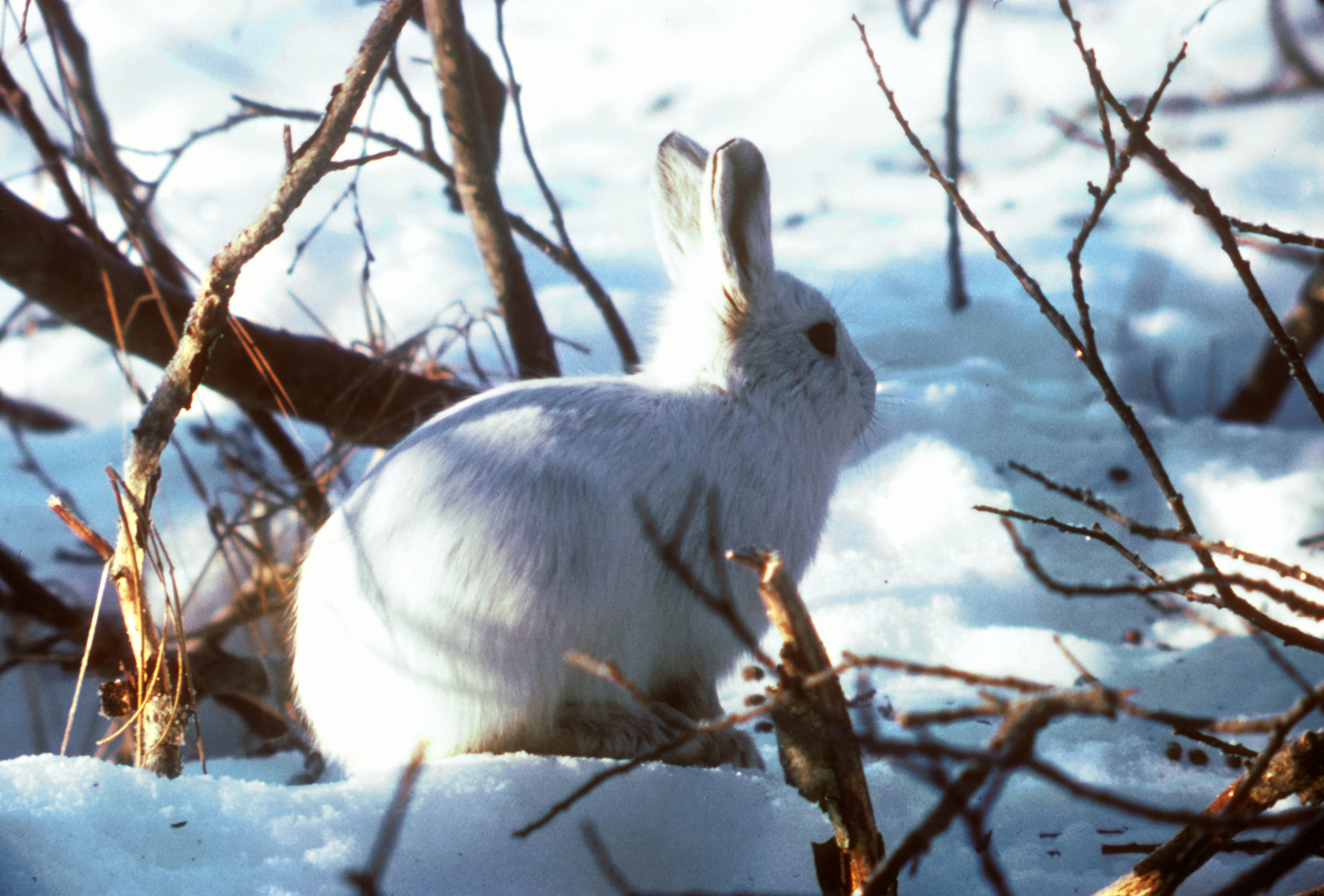
Prey have adaptations such as cryptic coloration in this Alaskan hare which help them avoid predators.

Predators are in an evolutionary arms race with their prey, for which advantageous mutations are constantly preserved by natural selection. In turn, predators, too, are subject to such selective pressure, those most successful in locating prey passing on their genes in greater number to the next generation's gene pool. Adaptations of prey that allow them to avoid predators are widespread, those that make them hard to find being collectively known as crypsis. Crypsis may involve temporal evasion such as nocturnality, behavioral methods such as hiding, and non-behavioral adaptations such as camouflage. Antipredator adaptations include methods other than crypsis, such as aposematism and the ability to fight.

Often behavioral and passive characteristics are combined; for example, a prey animal may look similar to and behave like its hunter's own predator (see mimicry).

== Prey detection using different senses ==
There are a variety of methods used to detect prey. Sensory systems used include the visual system, olfactory system (smell), auditory system (hearing) and the somatosensory system (such as touch). Some predators may use all of these senses in pinpointing their prey, while others may depend mainly or entirely on a single one. Detection methods may also be divided into direct detection of the prey organism itself, and indirect clues, such as the smell of its urine.

=== Visual ===
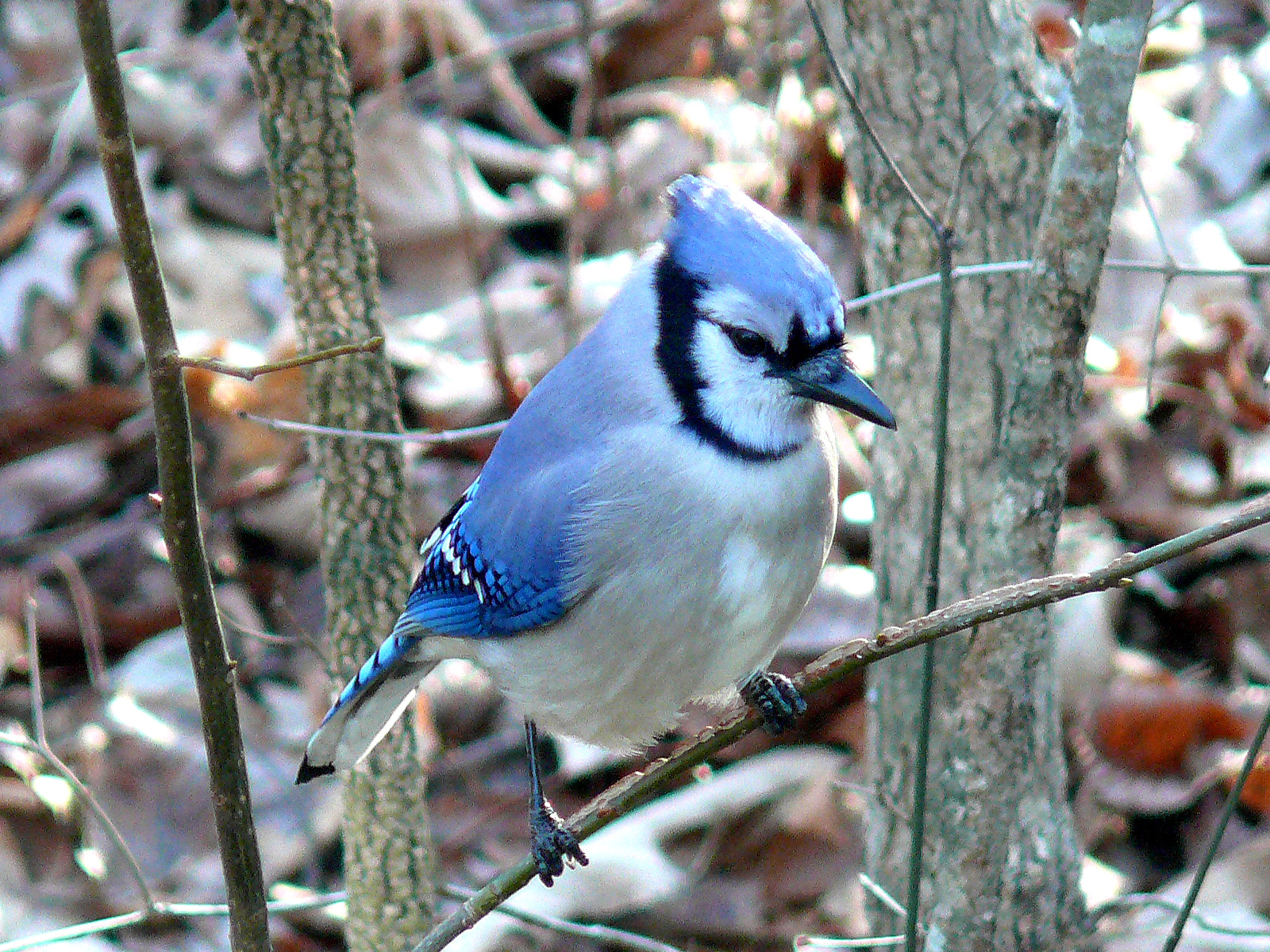
Experiments on blue jays suggest they form a search image for certain prey.

Visual predators may form what is termed a search image of certain prey.

Predators need not locate their host directly: Kestrels, for instance, are able to detect the faeces and urine of their prey (which reflect ultraviolet), allowing them to identify areas where there are large numbers of voles, for example. This adaptation is essential in prey detection, as voles are quick to hide from such predators.

In experimental settings, animals have demonstrated perceptual switching: visual predator would form a searching image of the most abundant cryptic prey species in their environment; as the species is more predated, its number would decrease and the search image for that species would be less useful to the predator; the predator would then switch to a search image of a prey that became more abundant.

=== Chemical ===
For many animals the chemical senses are far more important than vision or hearing. Some specialist predatory beetle(s) can locate their bark beetle prey using the pheromones their targets secrete. Pheromones that are exploited by an enemy like this are called kairomones.

=== Auditory ===
Some predators rely mainly on sound cues to detect prey. In nocturnal predators non-visual clues are especially important. The barn owl (Tyto alba) relies on noises made by prey, and can locate prey animals with great precision. Bats have the added capability of echolocation to locate prey like flying insects; they can therefore locate prey even if they make no sound.

== Following detection ==
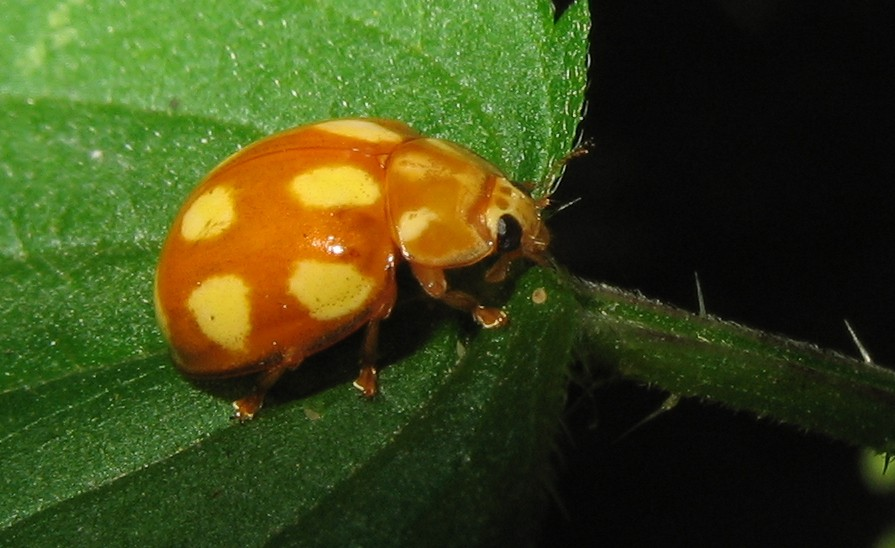
This ladybeetle (Calvia decemguttata) is easily spotted, but its conspicuous colors are a sign of its unpalatability, with which experienced predators would probably be familiar.

Once a predator has found its prey it will not always attempt to chase or eat it. Prey have other ways of deterring predators from eating them besides avoiding detection. Aposematic plants and animals may have conspicuous coloration such that potential consumers such as a herbivore will avoid eating them based on unpleasant past experiences. Even if a predator may wish to eat its prey, locomotive animals may be extremely difficult to catch.

Animals living in groups have increased vigilance, and even solitary animals are capable of rapid escape when needed. Even if it does make a capture, its prey may attract competing predators, giving it a chance to escape in the struggle. It may also strike a non-vital organ: some species have deceptive appearances such that one part of their body resembles another, such as insects with false heads. This makes consumption (or fatal wounds) less probable, giving the prey a second chance at escaping.

Predators may have extensive capabilities in finding prey, but even when they are successful in doing so they may not end up with a meal.

== See also ==
- Observational learning
- Optimal foraging theory
