= Theridion flabelliferum =

Conservation status
- Not Threatened (NZ TCS)

Scientific classification
- Kingdom: Animalia
- Phylum: Arthropoda
- Subphylum: Chelicerata
- Class: Arachnida
- Order: Araneae
- Infraorder: Araneomorphae
- Family: Theridiidae
- Genus: Theridion
- Species: T. flabelliferum

Binomial name
- Theridion flabelliferum Urquhart, 1887

Synonyms
- Theridion venustulum

Species of spider

Theridion flabelliferum is a species of Theridiidae that is endemic to New Zealand.

== Taxonomy ==
This species was described in 1887 by Arthur Urquhart from female specimens.

== Description ==
The female is recorded at 4.3mm in length. The cephalothorax is coloured yellow amber. The legs are straw brown. The abdomen is yellowish olive with creamy flecks.

== Distribution ==
This species is only known from Waiwera, New Zealand.

== Conservation status ==
Under the New Zealand Threat Classification System, this species is listed as "Not Threatened".
