= Theridion albocinctum =

Conservation status
- Data Deficit (NZ TCS)

Scientific classification
- Kingdom: Animalia
- Phylum: Arthropoda
- Subphylum: Chelicerata
- Class: Arachnida
- Order: Araneae
- Infraorder: Araneomorphae
- Family: Theridiidae
- Genus: Theridion
- Species: T. albocinctum

Binomial name
- Theridion albocinctum Urquhart, 1892

Species of spider

Theridion albocinctum is a species of Theridiidae that is endemic to New Zealand.

== Taxonomy ==
This species was described in 1892 by Arthur Urquhart from a female specimen.

== Description ==
The female is recorded at 4.1mm in length. The cephalothorax is coloured orange ochreous. The legs are yellow ochreous. The abdomen is light brown with shades of olive green and brown flecks.

== Distribution ==
This species is only known from Stratford, New Zealand.

== Conservation status ==
Under the New Zealand Threat Classification System, this species is listed as "Data Deficient" with the qualifiers of "Data Poor: Size", "Data Poor: Trend" and "One Location".
