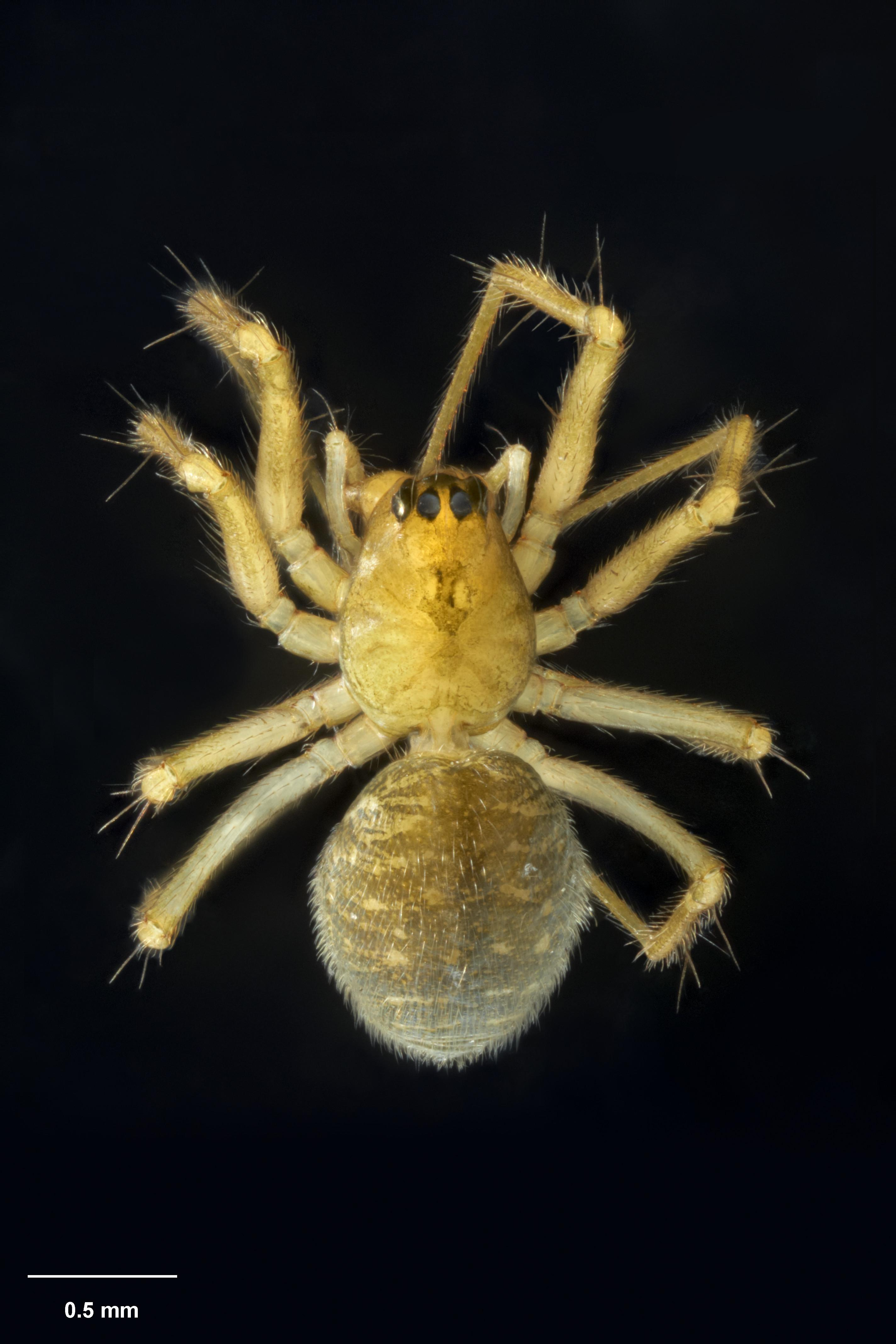
- Novalaetesia atra

Scientific classification
- Kingdom: Animalia
- Phylum: Arthropoda
- Subphylum: Chelicerata
- Class: Arachnida
- Order: Araneae
- Infraorder: Araneomorphae
- Family: Linyphiidae
- Genus: Novalaetesia; Millidge, 1988

Type species
- N. anceps Millidge, 1988

Species
- 2, see text

= Novalaetesia =

Genus of spiders

Novalaetesia is a genus of South Pacific dwarf spiders that was first described by Alfred Frank Millidge in 1988.

== Species ==
As of May 2019 it contains two species:

- Novalaetesia anceps Millidge, 1988 (type) – New Zealand
- Novalaetesia atra Blest & Vink, 2003 – New Zealand
