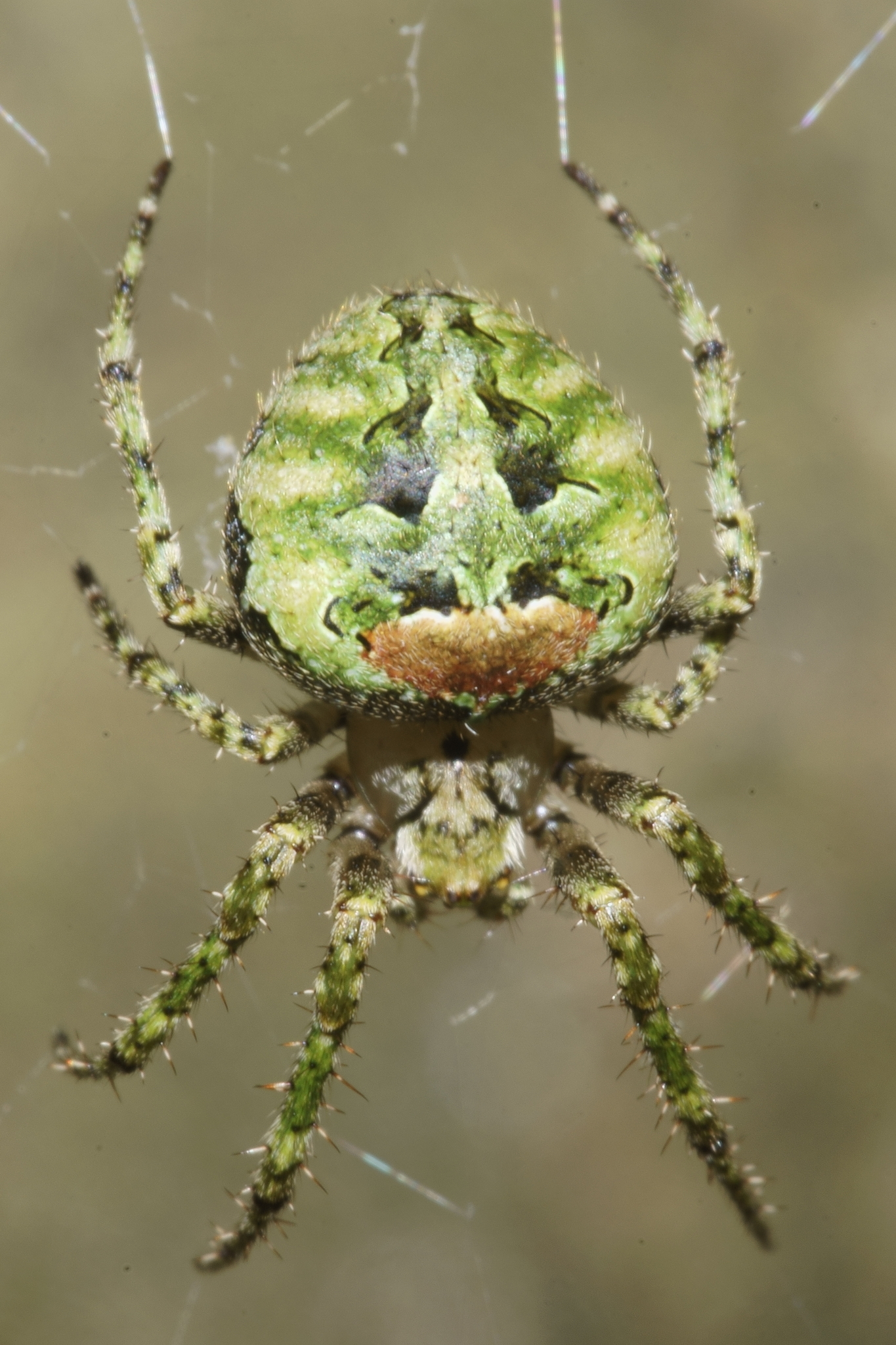

Conservation status
- Not Threatened (NZ TCS)

Scientific classification
- Domain: Eukaryota
- Kingdom: Animalia
- Phylum: Arthropoda
- Subphylum: Chelicerata
- Class: Arachnida
- Order: Araneae
- Infraorder: Araneomorphae
- Family: Araneidae
- Genus: Cryptaranea
- Species: C. subcompta

Binomial name
- Cryptaranea subcompta (Urquhart, 1887)

Synonyms
- Epeira sub-compta; Epeira peronginia

= Cryptaranea subcompta =

Species of Arachnida

Cryptaranea subcompta is a species of orb-weaver spider that is endemic to New Zealand.

== Taxonomy ==
This species was described as Epeira sub-compta in 1887 by Arthur Urquhart from female specimens collected in Whangarei. It was most recently revised in 1988, in which it was transferred to the Cryptaranea genus.

== Description ==
The female is recorded at 9.2mm in length whereas the male is 9.2mm. This species is generally mottled green in colour, but may also be brown or black. There is a patch on the anterior dorsal surface of the abdomen that is usually green, but can also be white or red.

== Distribution ==
This species is endemic and widespread throughout New Zealand.

== Conservation status ==
Under the New Zealand Threat Classification System, this species is listed as "Not Threatened".
