= Cryptaranea venustula =

Conservation status
- Not Threatened (NZ TCS)

Scientific classification
- Domain: Eukaryota
- Kingdom: Animalia
- Phylum: Arthropoda
- Subphylum: Chelicerata
- Class: Arachnida
- Order: Araneae
- Infraorder: Araneomorphae
- Family: Araneidae
- Genus: Cryptaranea
- Species: C. venustula

Binomial name
- Cryptaranea venustula (Urquhart, 1891)

Synonyms
- Epeira venustula; Epeira munda; Epeira munda inversa; Araneus venustulus; Aranea mundania; Aranea mundania inversa

Species of Arachnida

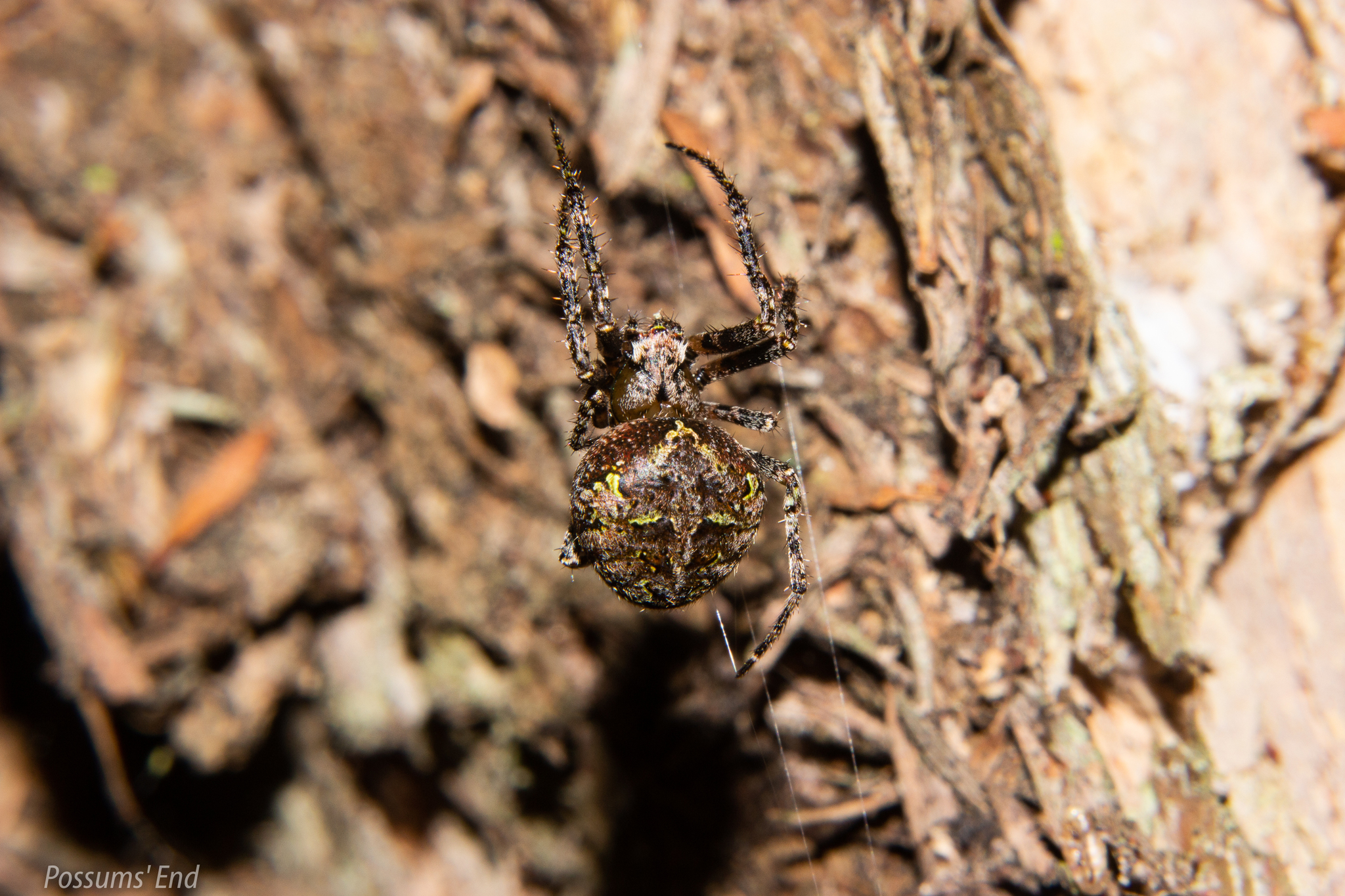

Cryptaranea venustula is a species of orb-weaver spider that is endemic to New Zealand.

== Taxonomy ==
This species was described as Epeira venustula in 1891 by Arthur Urquhart from a female specimen collected in Stratford. It was most recently revised in 1988, in which it was transferred to the Cryptaranea genus.

== Description ==
The female is recorded at 6.5mm in length whereas the male is 3.4mm.

== Distribution ==
This species is widespread throughout New Zealand, including the Chatham Islands.

== Conservation status ==
Under the New Zealand Threat Classification System, this species is listed as "Not Threatened".
