= Theridion argentatulum =

Conservation status
- Data Deficit (NZ TCS)

Scientific classification
- Kingdom: Animalia
- Phylum: Arthropoda
- Subphylum: Chelicerata
- Class: Arachnida
- Order: Araneae
- Infraorder: Araneomorphae
- Family: Theridiidae
- Genus: Theridion
- Species: T. argentatulum

Binomial name
- Theridion argentatulum Roewer, 1942

Synonyms
- Theridion argentatum

Species of spider

Theridion argentatulum is a species of Theridiidae that is endemic to New Zealand.

== Taxonomy ==
This species was described as Theridion argentatum in 1892 by Arthur Urquhart from a female specimen. In 1942, the species name was changed to Theridion argentatulum.

== Description ==
The female is recorded at 3.2mm in length.

== Distribution ==
This species is only known from Hawera, New Zealand.

== Conservation status ==
Under the New Zealand Threat Classification System, this species is listed as "Data Deficient" with the qualifiers of "Data Poor: Size", "Data Poor: Trend" and "One Location".
