= Theridion ampliatum =

Conservation status
- Not Threatened (NZ TCS)

Scientific classification
- Kingdom: Animalia
- Phylum: Arthropoda
- Subphylum: Chelicerata
- Class: Arachnida
- Order: Araneae
- Infraorder: Araneomorphae
- Family: Theridiidae
- Genus: Theridion
- Species: T. ampliatum

Binomial name
- Theridion ampliatum Urquhart, 1892

Species of spider

Theridion ampliatum is a species of Theridiidae that is endemic to New Zealand.

== Taxonomy ==
This species was described in 1892 by Arthur Urquhart from a female specimen. It was redescribed in 1935.

== Description ==
The female is recorded at 3.8mm in length. The cephalothorax is coloured orange ochreous. The legs are creamy ochreous. The abdomen is yellowish olive green and is covered in flecks.

== Distribution ==
This species is only known from Stratford, New Zealand.

== Conservation status ==
Under the New Zealand Threat Classification System, this species is listed as "Not Threatened".
