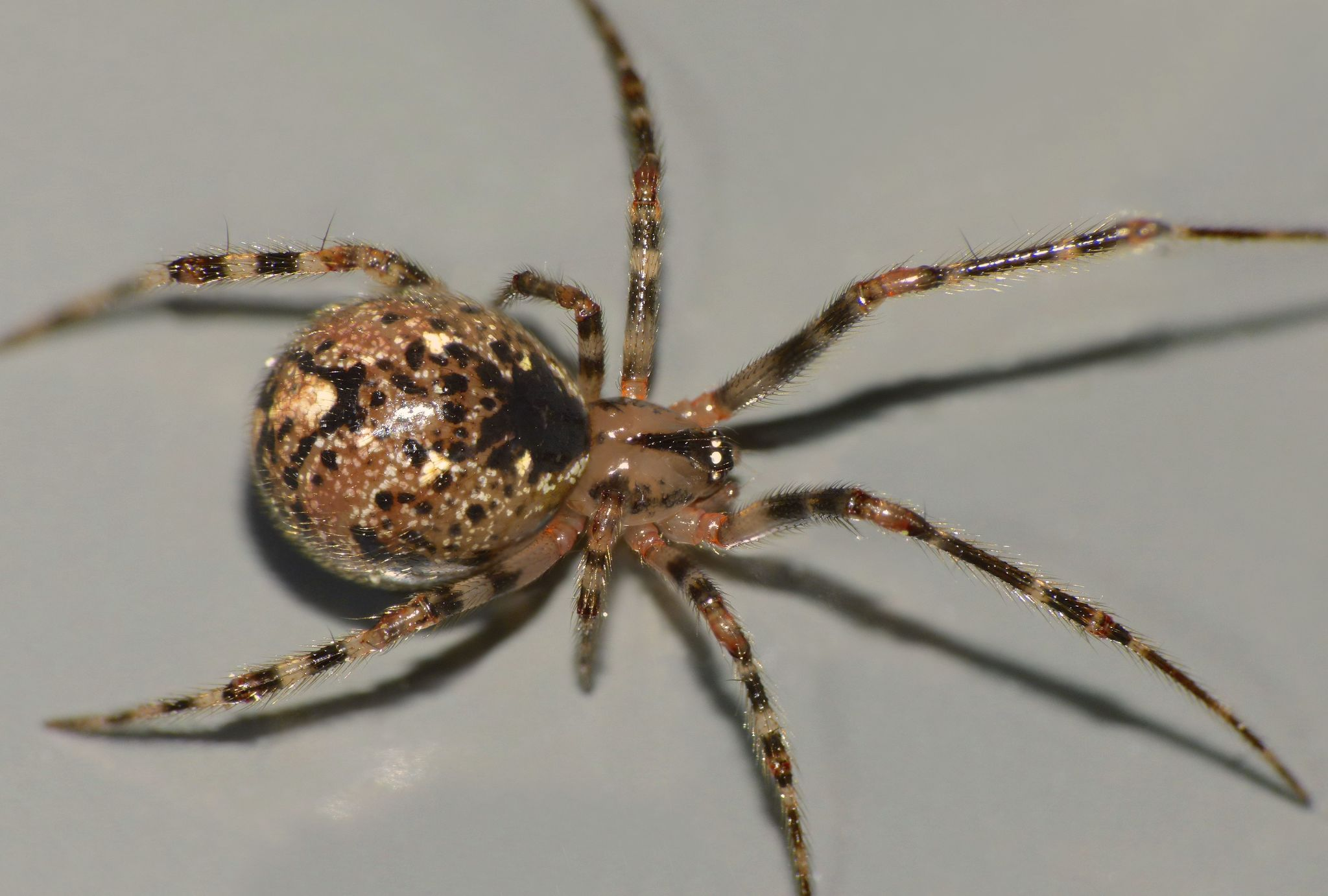

Conservation status
- Not Threatened (NZ TCS)

Scientific classification
- Kingdom: Animalia
- Phylum: Arthropoda
- Subphylum: Chelicerata
- Class: Arachnida
- Order: Araneae
- Infraorder: Araneomorphae
- Family: Theridiidae
- Genus: Theridion
- Species: T. zantholabio

Binomial name
- Theridion zantholabio Urquhart, 1886

= Theridion zantholabio =

Species of spider

Theridion zantholabio is a species of Theridiidae that is endemic to New Zealand.

== Taxonomy ==
This species was described in 1886 by Arthur Urquhart from female specimens. It was most recently revised in 1935.

== Description ==
The female is recorded at 5.2mm in length.

== Distribution ==
This species is known from New Zealand.

== Conservation status ==
Under the New Zealand Threat Classification System, this species is listed as "Not Threatened".
