= Diploplecta pumilio =

Conservation status
- Data Deficient (NZ TCS)

Scientific classification
- Domain: Eukaryota
- Kingdom: Animalia
- Phylum: Arthropoda
- Subphylum: Chelicerata
- Class: Arachnida
- Order: Araneae
- Infraorder: Araneomorphae
- Family: Linyphiidae
- Genus: Diploplecta
- Species: D. pumilio

Binomial name
- Diploplecta pumilio (Urquhart, 1886)

Synonyms
- Theridion pumilio

Species of Arachnida

Diploplecta pumilio is a species of Linyphiidae spider that is endemic to New Zealand.

== Taxonomy ==
This species was described as Theridion pumilio in 1886 by Arthur Urquhart from female and male specimens collected in Te Karaka. It was most recently revised in 2020, in which it was transferred to the Diploplecta genus.

== Description ==
The female is recorded at 1.75-2mm in length whereas the male is 1.5mm.

== Distribution ==
This species is endemic to New Zealand.

== Conservation status ==
Under the New Zealand Threat Classification System, this species is listed as "Data Deficient" with the qualifiers of "Data Poor: Size", "Data Poor: Trend" and "One Location".
