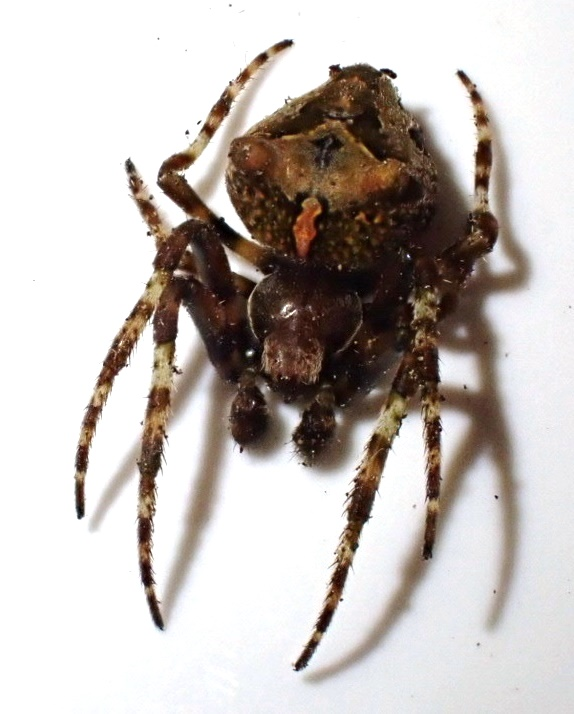

Conservation status
- Data Deficient (NZ TCS)

Scientific classification
- Kingdom: Animalia
- Phylum: Arthropoda
- Subphylum: Chelicerata
- Class: Arachnida
- Order: Araneae
- Infraorder: Araneomorphae
- Family: Araneidae
- Genus: Courtaraneus; Framenau, Vink, McQuillan & Simpson, 2022
- Species: C. orientalis

Binomial name
- Courtaraneus orientalis (Urquhart, 1887)

Synonyms
- Epeira orientalis; Neoscona orientalis

= Courtaraneus =

Species of spider

Courtaraneus orientalis is a species of Araneidae that is endemic to New Zealand. It is currently the only species in Courtaraneus, which was described in 2022.

== Taxonomy ==
This species was described as Epeira orientalis in 1887 by Arthur Urquhart from female and male specimens collected in Te Karaka. It was most recently revised in 2022, in which it was moved to the Courtaraneus genus. It is the only member of the genus.

== Description ==
The female is recorded at 11.5 mm in length whereas the male is 7.3 mm. This species has complex colour patterns.

== Distribution ==
This species is only known from the North Island of New Zealand.

== Conservation status ==
Under the New Zealand Threat Classification System, this species is listed as "Data Deficient" with the qualifiers of "Data Poor: Size" and "Data Poor: Trend".
