= Laetesia trispathulata =

Conservation status
- Not Threatened (NZ TCS)

Scientific classification
- Domain: Eukaryota
- Kingdom: Animalia
- Phylum: Arthropoda
- Subphylum: Chelicerata
- Class: Arachnida
- Order: Araneae
- Infraorder: Araneomorphae
- Family: Linyphiidae
- Genus: Laetesia
- Species: L. trispathulata

Binomial name
- Laetesia trispathulata (Urquhart, 1886)

Synonyms
- Linyphia trisphathulata; Lepthyphantes trispathulatus

Species of spider

Laetesia trispathulata is a species of sheet weaver spider found in New Zealand.

== Taxonomy ==
This species was described as Linyphia trisphathulata in 1886 by Arthur Urquhart from female and male specimens. It was most recently revised in 2003.

== Description ==
The female is recorded at 2.7-3.3mm in length whereas the male is 3.3mm. This species has a pale brown carapace with a medial band. The legs are yellow. The abdomen has variable markings.

== Distribution ==
This species is known from the North Island and upper South Island of New Zealand.

== Conservation status ==
Under the New Zealand Threat Classification System, this species is listed as "Not Threatened".
