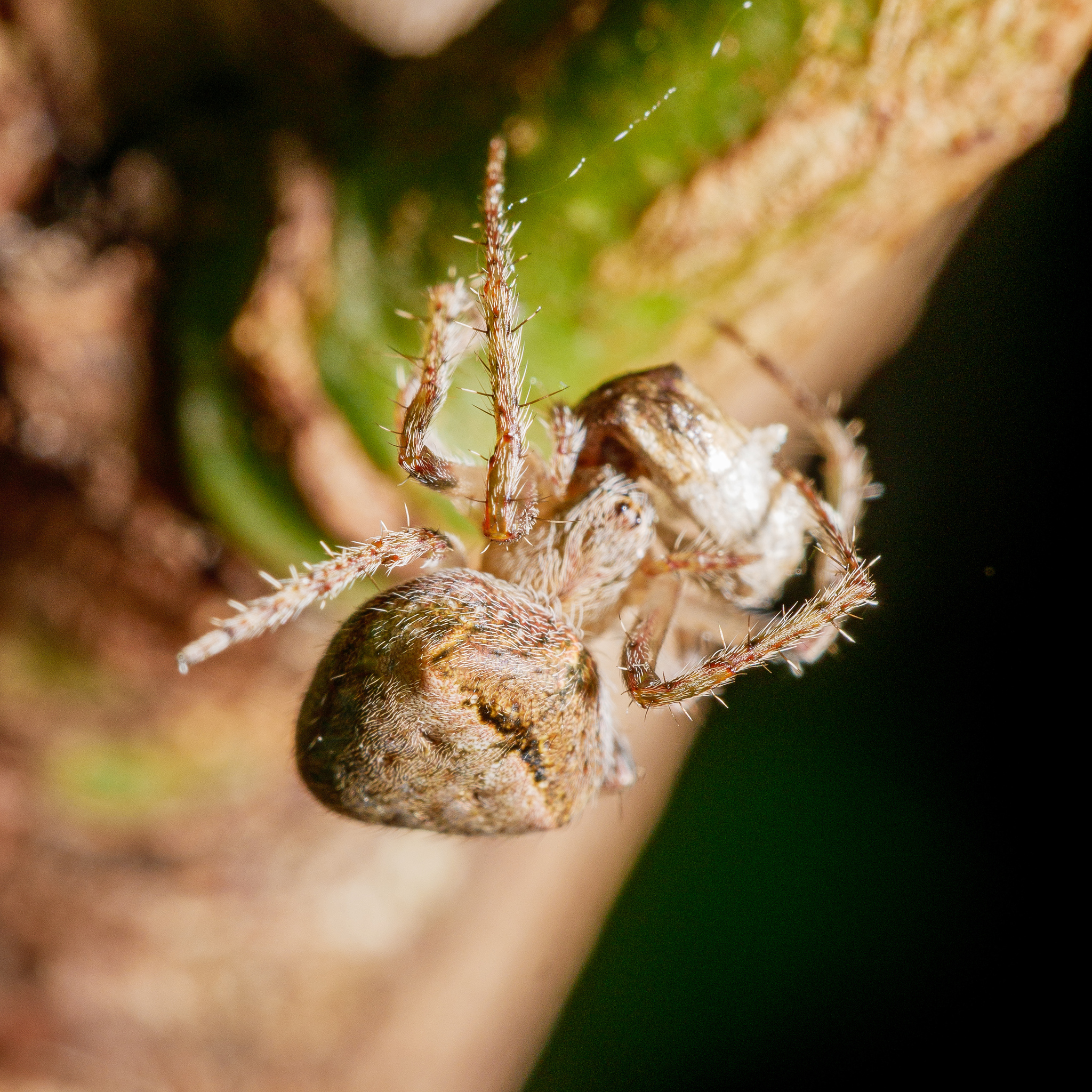

Conservation status
- Not Threatened (NZ TCS)

Scientific classification
- Domain: Eukaryota
- Kingdom: Animalia
- Phylum: Arthropoda
- Subphylum: Chelicerata
- Class: Arachnida
- Order: Araneae
- Infraorder: Araneomorphae
- Family: Araneidae
- Genus: Cryptaranea
- Species: C. albolineata

Binomial name
- Cryptaranea albolineata (Urquhart, 1893)

Synonyms
- Epeira albo-lineata

= Cryptaranea albolineata =

Species of Arachnida

Cryptaranea albolineata is a species of orb-weaver spider that is endemic to New Zealand.

== Taxonomy ==
This species was described as Epeira albo-lineata in 1893 by Arthur Urquhart from a female specimen collected in Ohaupo. It was most recently revised in 1988, in which it was transferred to the Cryptaranea genus.

== Description ==
The female is recorded at 5.8mm in length whereas the male is 4.7mm. The colouration is variable, ranging from pale yellow brown to almost black. The abdomen often has a pale band anteriorly.

== Distribution ==
This species is endemic and widespread throughout New Zealand, including the Three Kings Islands and the Chatham Islands.

== Conservation status ==
Under the New Zealand Threat Classification System, this species is listed as "Not Threatened".
