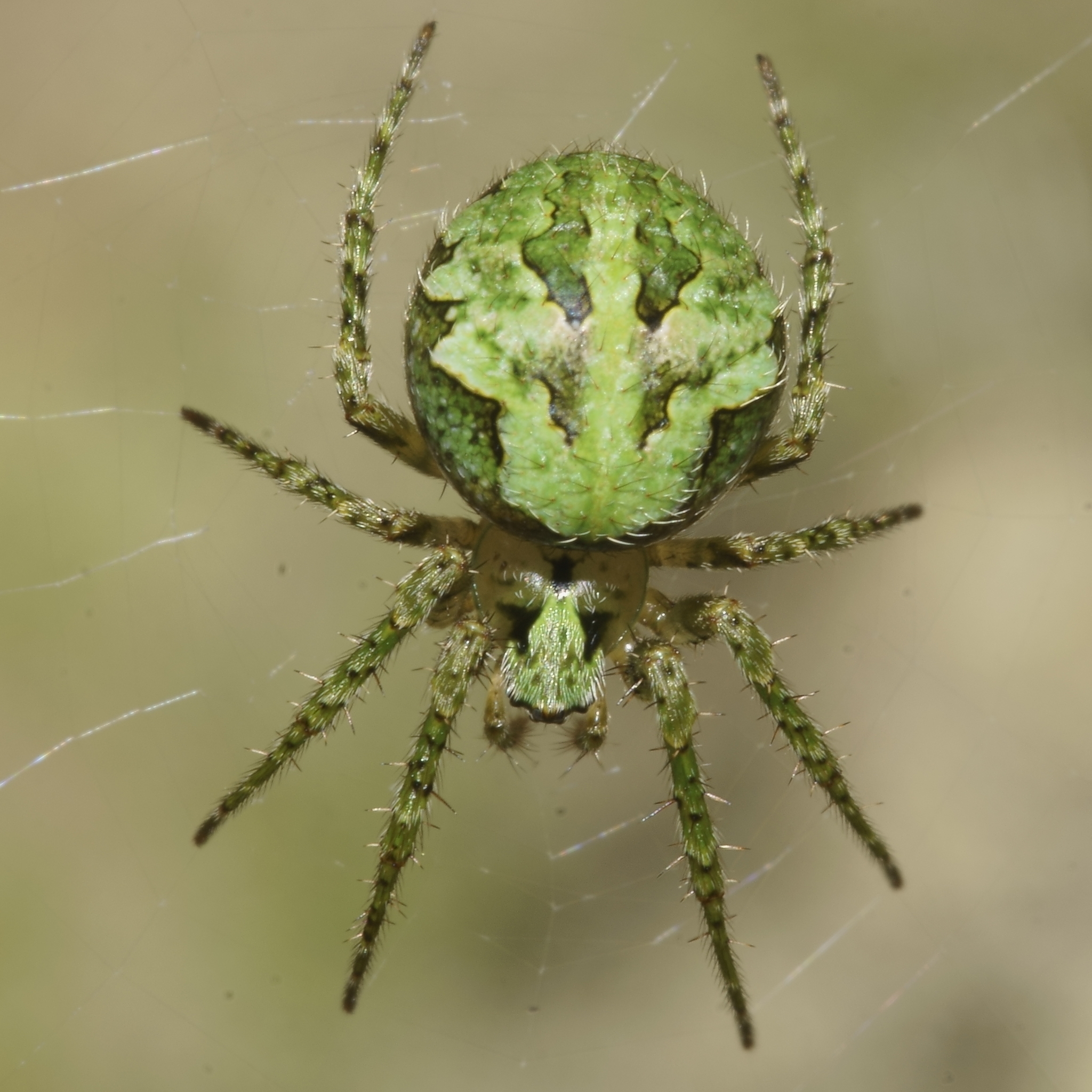

Conservation status
- Not Threatened (NZ TCS)

Scientific classification
- Domain: Eukaryota
- Kingdom: Animalia
- Phylum: Arthropoda
- Subphylum: Chelicerata
- Class: Arachnida
- Order: Araneae
- Infraorder: Araneomorphae
- Family: Araneidae
- Genus: Cryptaranea
- Species: C. atrihastula

Binomial name
- Cryptaranea atrihastula (Urquhart, 1891)

Synonyms
- Epeira atri-hastula; Epeira nigro-hastula

= Cryptaranea atrihastula =

Species of Arachnida

Cryptaranea atrihastula is a species of orb-weaver spider that is endemic to New Zealand.

== Taxonomy ==
This species was described as Epeira atri-hastula and Epeira nigro-hastula in 1891 by Arthur Urquhart from specimens collected in Stratford. It was most recently revised in 1988, in which it was transferred to the Cryptaranea genus.

== Description ==
The female is recorded at 4.9mm in length whereas the male is 4.5mm. This species is mottled green in colour.

== Distribution ==
This species is widespread throughout New Zealand in forests.

== Conservation status ==
Under the New Zealand Threat Classification System, this species is listed as "Not Threatened".
