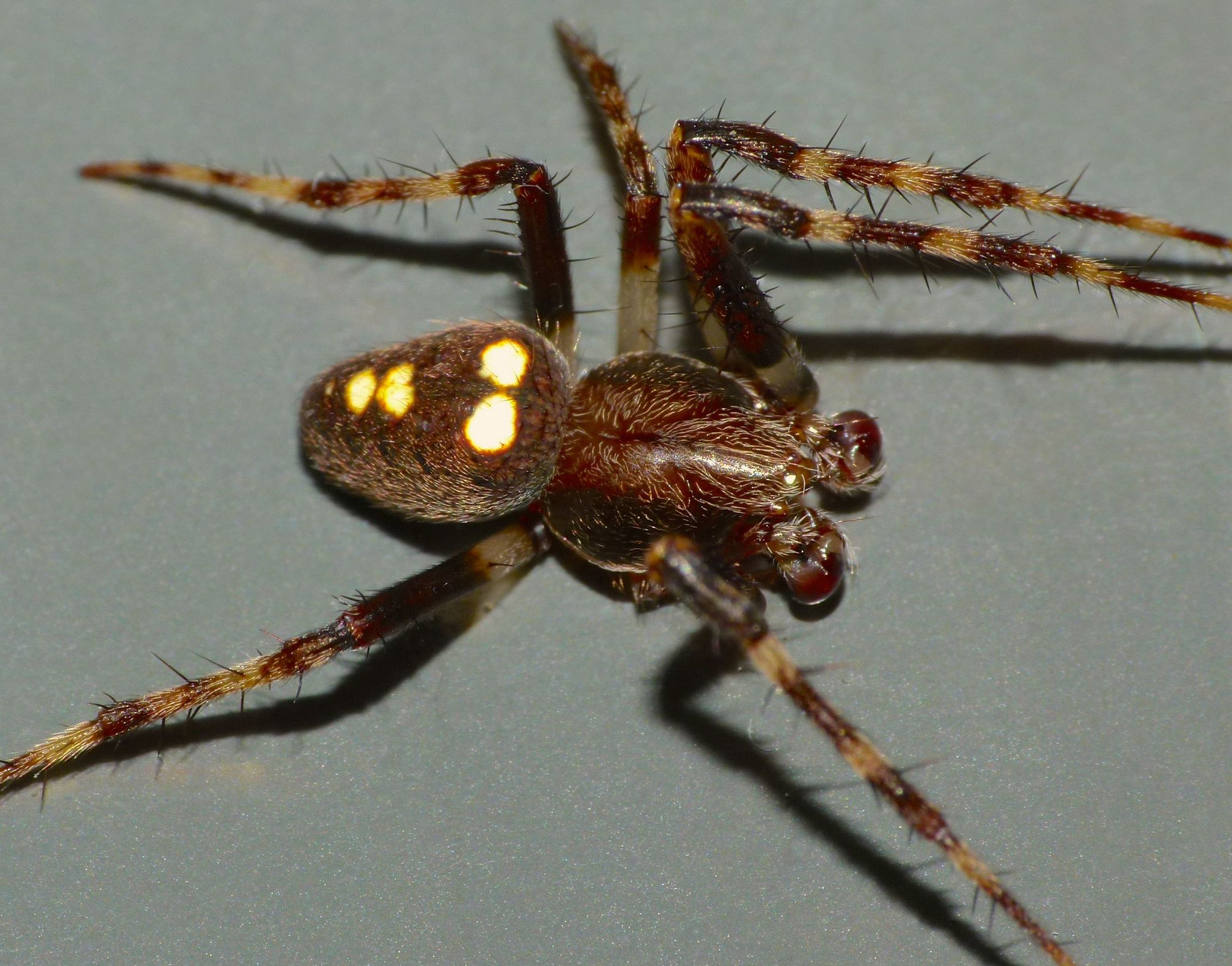

Conservation status
- Not Threatened (NZ TCS)

Scientific classification
- Domain: Eukaryota
- Kingdom: Animalia
- Phylum: Arthropoda
- Subphylum: Chelicerata
- Class: Arachnida
- Order: Araneae
- Infraorder: Araneomorphae
- Family: Araneidae
- Genus: Zealaranea
- Species: Z. trinotata

Binomial name
- Zealaranea trinotata (Urquhart, 1890)

Synonyms
- Epeira trinotata; Epeira trinotata olivinia; Epeira sublutia; Epeira aestiva; Aranea brounii olivinia

= Zealaranea trinotata =

Species of Arachnida

Zealaranea trinotata is a species of orb-weaver spider that is endemic to New Zealand.

== Taxonomy ==
This species was described as Eperia trinotata by Arthur Urquhart in 1890. It was most recently revised in 1988. The holotype is stored in Canterbury Museum.

== Description ==
The female is recorded at 10.8mm in length whereas the male is 8.7mm. The abdomen usually has distinctive white spots that vary in intensity between individuals.

== Distribution ==
This species is widespread throughout New Zealand.

== Conservation status ==
Under the New Zealand Threat Classification System, this species is listed as "Not Threatened".
