= Cryptaranea invisibilis =

Conservation status
- Not Threatened (NZ TCS)

Scientific classification
- Domain: Eukaryota
- Kingdom: Animalia
- Phylum: Arthropoda
- Subphylum: Chelicerata
- Class: Arachnida
- Order: Araneae
- Infraorder: Araneomorphae
- Family: Araneidae
- Genus: Cryptaranea
- Species: C. invisibilis

Binomial name
- Cryptaranea invisibilis (Urquhart, 1892)

Synonyms
- Epeira invisibilis

Species of Arachnida

Cryptaranea invisibilis is a species of orb-weaver spider that is endemic to New Zealand.

== Taxonomy ==
This species was described as Epeira invisibilis in 1892 by Arthur Urquhart from specimens collected in Dunedin by Peter Goyen. It was most recently revised in 1988, in which it was transferred to the Cryptaranea genus.

== Description ==
The female is recorded at 6.9mm in length whereas the male is 5.9mm. This species is brown, tinged with grey.

== Distribution ==
This species is widespread in New Zealand. It lives on cliffs in the spray zone of coasts.

== Conservation status ==
Under the New Zealand Threat Classification System, this species is listed as "Not Threatened".
