= Zealaranea saxitalis =

Conservation status
- Data Deficient (NZ TCS)

Scientific classification
- Domain: Eukaryota
- Kingdom: Animalia
- Phylum: Arthropoda
- Subphylum: Chelicerata
- Class: Arachnida
- Order: Araneae
- Infraorder: Araneomorphae
- Family: Araneidae
- Genus: Zealaranea
- Species: Z. saxitalis

Binomial name
- Zealaranea saxitalis (Urquhart, 1887)

Synonyms
- Epeira saxitalis

Species of Arachnida

Zealaranea saxitalis is a species of orb-weaver spider that is endemic to New Zealand.

== Taxonomy ==
This species was described as Epeira saxitalis by Arthur Urquhart in 1887 from subadult specimens. The holotype is stored in Canterbury Museum.

== Description ==
All known specimens of this species are subadults, so the form of the adult is unknown.

== Distribution ==
This species is only known from Waiwera near Auckland, New Zealand.

== Conservation status ==
Under the New Zealand Threat Classification System, this species is listed as "Data Deficient" with the qualifiers of "Data Poor: Size" and "Data Poor: Trend".
