= Laetesia mollita =

Scientific classification
- Kingdom: Animalia
- Phylum: Arthropoda
- Subphylum: Chelicerata
- Class: Arachnida
- Order: Araneae
- Infraorder: Araneomorphae
- Family: Linyphiidae
- Genus: Laetesia
- Species: L. mollita

Binomial name
- Laetesia mollita Simon, 1908

Species of spider

Laetesia mollita is a species of sheet weaver found in Western Australia. It was described by Simon in 1908.
