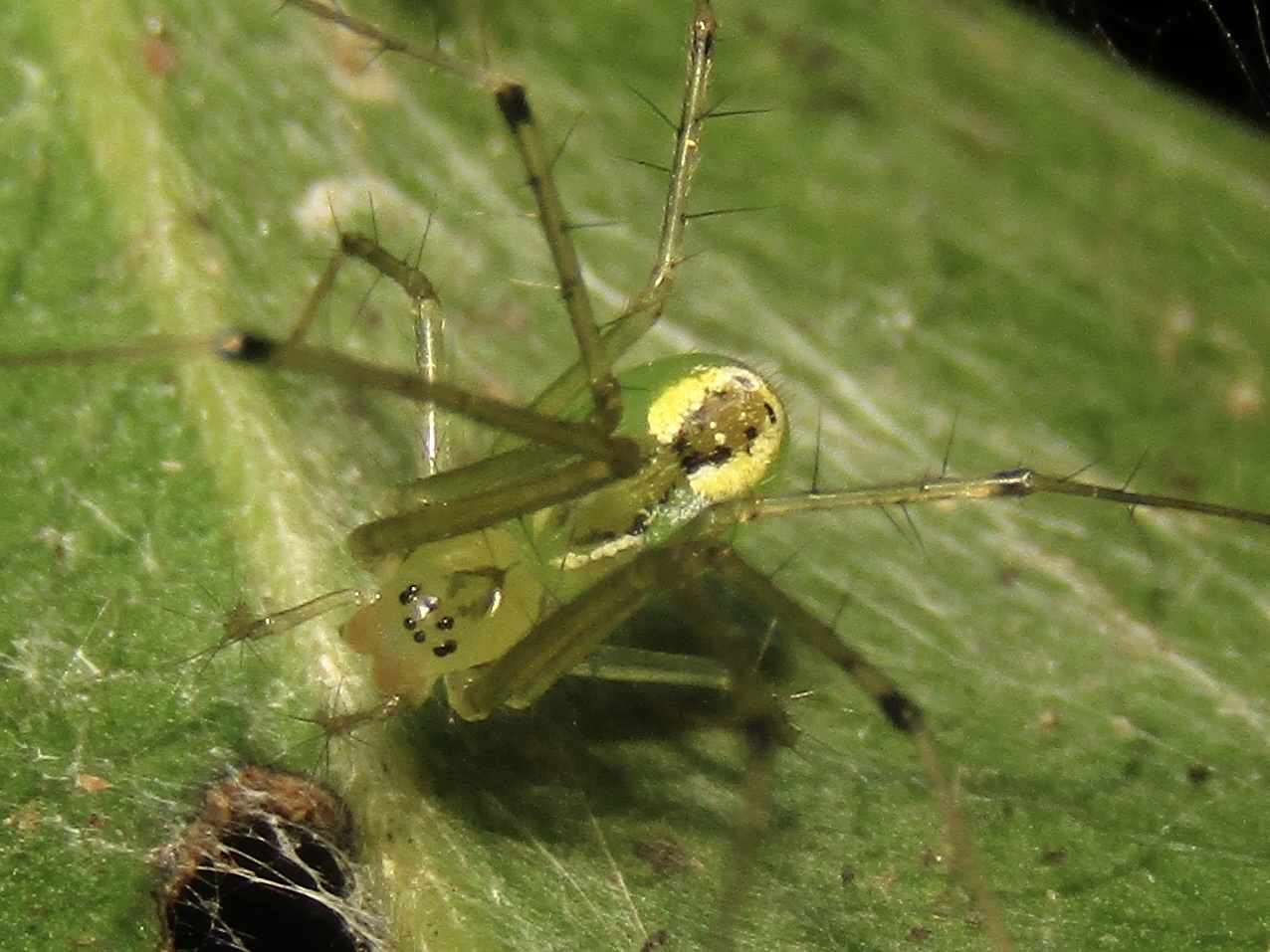

Scientific classification
- Kingdom: Animalia
- Phylum: Arthropoda
- Subphylum: Chelicerata
- Class: Arachnida
- Order: Araneae
- Infraorder: Araneomorphae
- Family: Linyphiidae
- Genus: Laetesia
- Species: L. raveni

Binomial name
- Laetesia raveni Hormiga & Scharff, 2014

= Laetesia raveni =

Species of spider

Laetesia raveni is a species of sheet weaver found in Queensland and New South Wales in Australia. It was described by Hormiga & Scharff in 2014. It exclusively builds its webs on two host plants: Calamus muelleri and Solanum inaequilaterum.
