= Laetesia leo =

Scientific classification
- Domain: Eukaryota
- Kingdom: Animalia
- Phylum: Arthropoda
- Subphylum: Chelicerata
- Class: Arachnida
- Order: Araneae
- Infraorder: Araneomorphae
- Family: Linyphiidae
- Genus: Laetesia
- Species: L. leo

Binomial name
- Laetesia leo van Helsdingen, 1972

Species of spider

Laetesia leo is a species of sheet weaver found in South Australia. It was described by van Helsdingen in 1972.
