= Laetesia minor =

Conservation status
- Not Threatened (NZ TCS)

Scientific classification
- Domain: Eukaryota
- Kingdom: Animalia
- Phylum: Arthropoda
- Subphylum: Chelicerata
- Class: Arachnida
- Order: Araneae
- Infraorder: Araneomorphae
- Family: Linyphiidae
- Genus: Laetesia
- Species: L. minor

Binomial name
- Laetesia minor Millidge, 1988

Species of spider

Laetesia minor is a species of sheet weaver endemic to New Zealand.

== Taxonomy ==
This species was described in 1988 by Alfred Frank Millidge from female and male specimens. The holotype is stored in Otago Museum.

== Description ==
The female is recorded at 1.8-2.0mm in length whereas the male is 2-2.1mm. This species has a pale yellow to pale brown carapace with grey diffused in it. The legs are yellow. The abdomen is grey to black with white markings.

== Distribution ==
This species is widespread in New Zealand.

== Conservation status ==
Under the New Zealand Threat Classification System, this species is listed as "Not Threatened".
