= Cryptaranea stewartensis =

Conservation status
- Data Deficient (NZ TCS)

Scientific classification
- Domain: Eukaryota
- Kingdom: Animalia
- Phylum: Arthropoda
- Subphylum: Chelicerata
- Class: Arachnida
- Order: Araneae
- Infraorder: Araneomorphae
- Family: Araneidae
- Genus: Cryptaranea
- Species: C. stewartensis

Binomial name
- Cryptaranea stewartensis Court & Forster, 1988

Species of Arachnida

Cryptaranea stewartensis is a species of orb-weaver spider that is endemic to New Zealand.

== Taxonomy ==
This species was described in 1988 by David Court and Ray Forster from female and male specimens collected in Stewart Island. The holotype is stored in the New Zealand Arthropod Collection under registration number NZAC03014958.

== Description ==
The female is recorded at 6.4mm in length whereas the male is 5.7mm.

== Distribution ==
This species is only known from Stewart Island and its surrounding islands in New Zealand.

== Conservation status ==
Under the New Zealand Threat Classification System, this species is listed as "Data Deficient" with the qualifiers of "Data Poor: Size" and "Data Poor: Trend".
