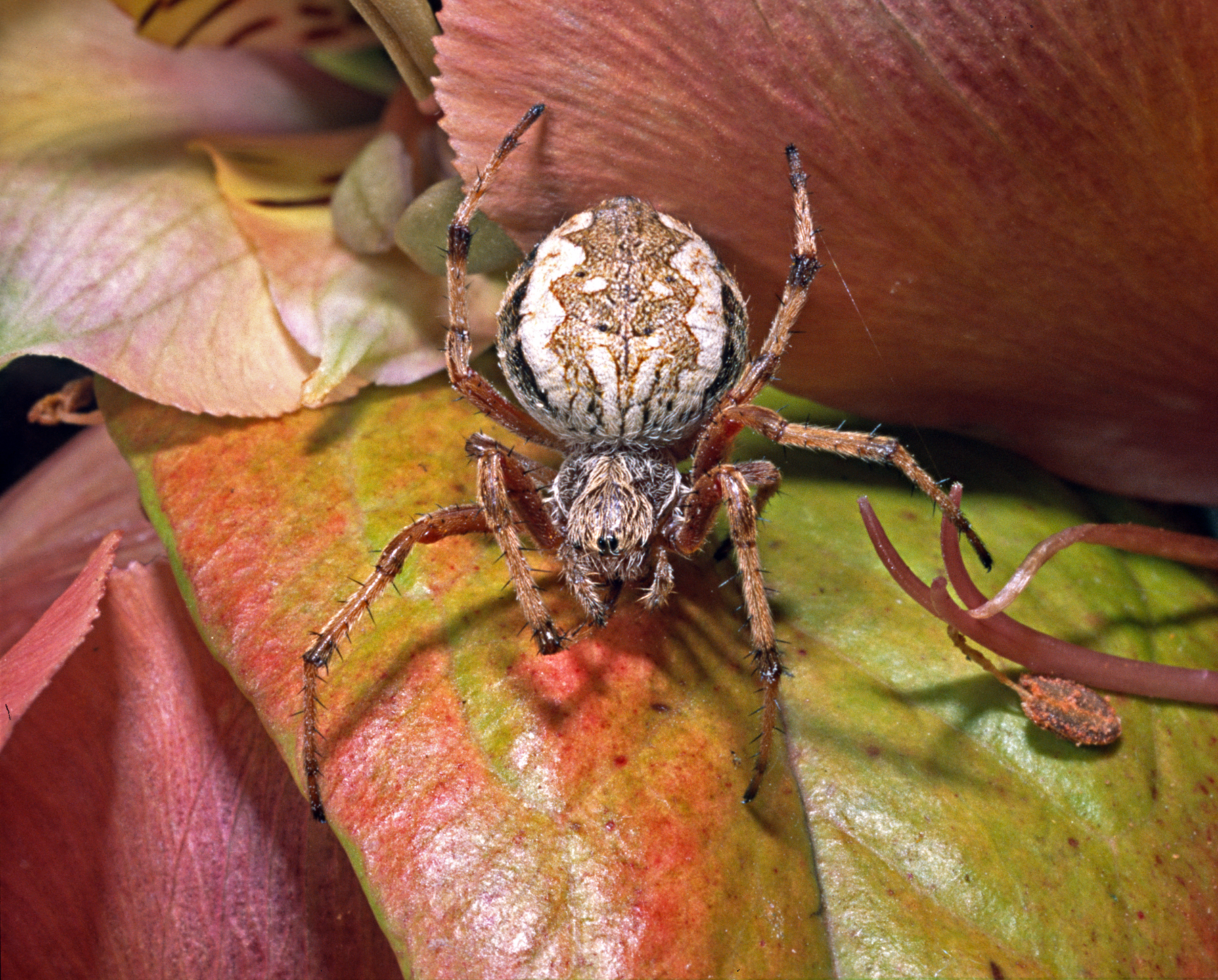
- Zealaranea sp.

Scientific classification
- Domain: Eukaryota
- Kingdom: Animalia
- Phylum: Arthropoda
- Subphylum: Chelicerata
- Class: Arachnida
- Order: Araneae
- Infraorder: Araneomorphae
- Family: Araneidae
- Genus: Zealaranea; Court & Forster, 1988

Type species
- Epeira crassa Walckenaer, 1841

Species
- 4, see text

= Zealaranea =

Genus of spiders

Zealaranea is a genus of orb-weaver spiders first described by D. J. Court & Raymond Robert Forster in 1988.

== Species ==
As of April 2019 it contains four species, all found in New Zealand:

- Zealaranea crassa (Walckenaer, 1841) (type) – New Zealand
- Zealaranea prina Court & Forster, 1988 – New Zealand
- Zealaranea saxitalis (Urquhart, 1887) – New Zealand
- Zealaranea trinotata (Urquhart, 1890) – New Zealand
