= Diploplecta opaca =

Conservation status
- Not Threatened (NZ TCS)

Scientific classification
- Domain: Eukaryota
- Kingdom: Animalia
- Phylum: Arthropoda
- Subphylum: Chelicerata
- Class: Arachnida
- Order: Araneae
- Infraorder: Araneomorphae
- Family: Linyphiidae
- Genus: Diploplecta
- Species: D. opaca

Binomial name
- Diploplecta opaca Millidge, 1988

Species of Arachnida

Diploplecta opaca is a species of Linyphiidae spider that is endemic to New Zealand.

== Taxonomy ==
This species was described in 1988 by Alfred Frank Millidge from female and male specimens. The holotype is stored in Otago Museum.

== Description ==
The female is recorded at 1.6-1.8mm in length whereas the male is 1.55-1.6mm. This species has a brown carapace that is darker dorsally and laterally. The legs are yellow brown to orange. The abdomen is variable in colouration.

== Distribution ==
This species is only known from the South Island and Snares Island in New Zealand.

== Conservation status ==
Under the New Zealand Threat Classification System, this species is listed as "Not Threatened".
