= Diploplecta duplex =

Conservation status
- Not Threatened (NZ TCS)

Scientific classification
- Domain: Eukaryota
- Kingdom: Animalia
- Phylum: Arthropoda
- Subphylum: Chelicerata
- Class: Arachnida
- Order: Araneae
- Infraorder: Araneomorphae
- Family: Linyphiidae
- Genus: Diploplecta
- Species: D. duplex

Binomial name
- Diploplecta duplex Millidge, 1988

Species of Arachnida

Diploplecta duplex is a species of Linyphiidae spider that is endemic to New Zealand.

== Taxonomy ==
This species was described in 1988 by Alfred Frank Millidge from female and male specimens. The holotype is stored in Otago Museum.

== Description ==
The female is recorded at 1.5-1.75mm in length whereas the male is 1.5mm. This species has a yellow to orange carapace with black markings dorsally and laterally. The legs are pale brown to orange brown. The abdomen is white with blackish markings.

== Distribution ==
This species is known from scattered localities throughout New Zealand.

== Conservation status ==
Under the New Zealand Threat Classification System, this species is listed as "Not Threatened".
