= Laetesia weburdi =

Scientific classification
- Domain: Eukaryota
- Kingdom: Animalia
- Phylum: Arthropoda
- Subphylum: Chelicerata
- Class: Arachnida
- Order: Araneae
- Infraorder: Araneomorphae
- Family: Linyphiidae
- Genus: Laetesia
- Species: L. weburdi

Binomial name
- Laetesia weburdi (Urquhart, 1980)

Species of spider

Laetesia weburdi is a species of sheet weaver found in New South Wales, Australia. It was described by Urquhart in 1980.
