= Laetesia bellissima =

Conservation status
- Not Threatened (NZ TCS)

Scientific classification
- Kingdom: Animalia
- Phylum: Arthropoda
- Subphylum: Chelicerata
- Class: Arachnida
- Order: Araneae
- Infraorder: Araneomorphae
- Family: Linyphiidae
- Genus: Laetesia
- Species: L. bellissima

Binomial name
- Laetesia bellissima Millidge, 1988

Species of spider

Laetesia bellissima is a species of sheet weaver endemic to New Zealand.

== Taxonomy ==
This species was described in 1988 by Alfred Frank Millidge from female and male specimens. The holotype is stored in Otago Museum.

== Description ==
The female is recorded at 2.65-3.0mm in length whereas the male is 2.7-2.9mm. This species has blackish brown carapace with a medial band. The legs are pale yellow to brown. The abdomen is white dorsally with dark markings.

== Distribution ==
This species is only known from the South Island of New Zealand.

== Conservation status ==
Under the New Zealand Threat Classification System, this species is listed as "Not Threatened".
