= Laetesia oceaniae =

Scientific classification
- Domain: Eukaryota
- Kingdom: Animalia
- Phylum: Arthropoda
- Subphylum: Chelicerata
- Class: Arachnida
- Order: Araneae
- Infraorder: Araneomorphae
- Family: Linyphiidae
- Genus: Laetesia
- Species: L. oceaniae

Binomial name
- Laetesia oceaniae (Berland, 1938)

Species of spider

Laetesia oceaniae is a species of sheet weaver found in the New Hebrides. It was described by Berland in 1938.
