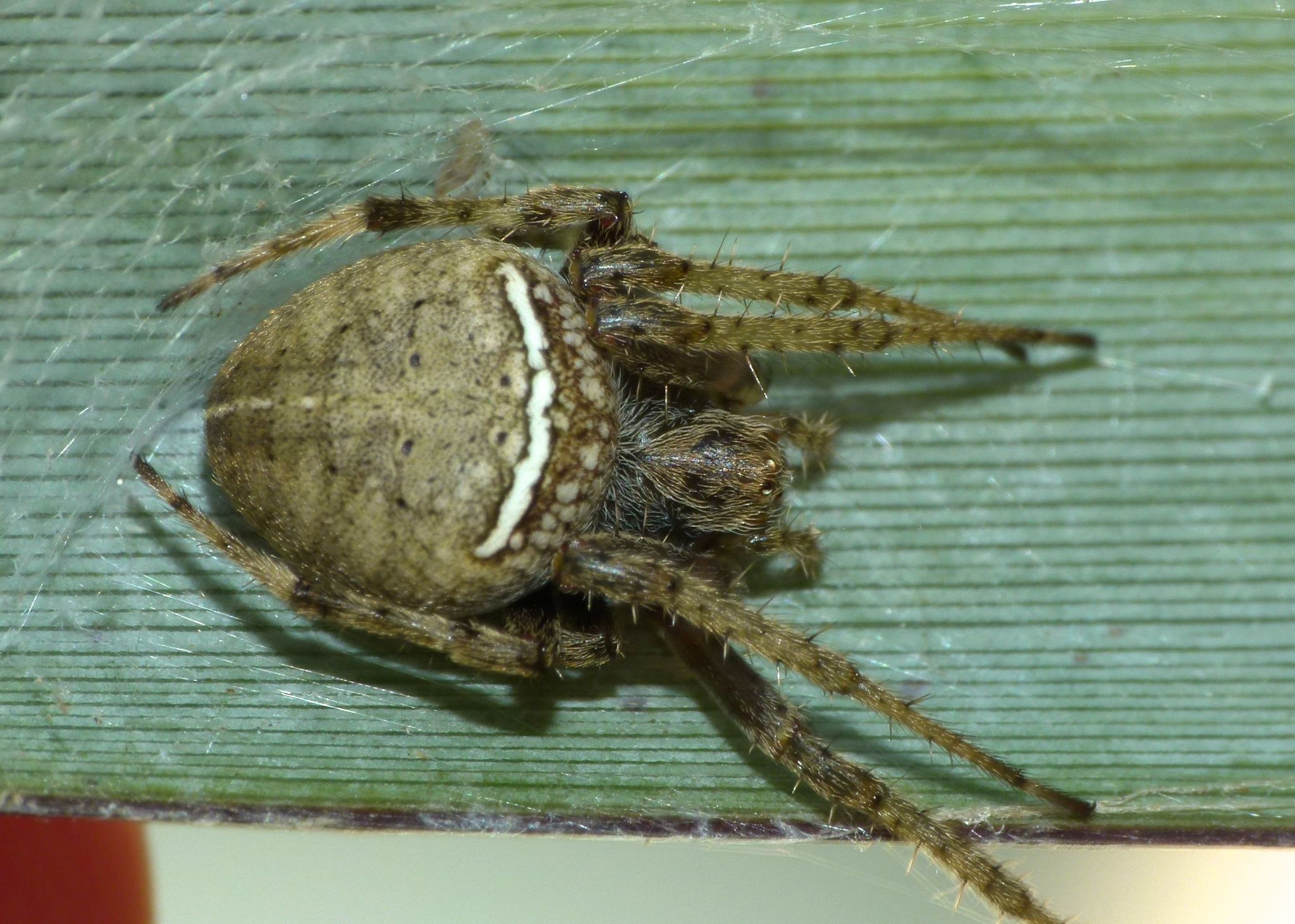

Conservation status
- Not Threatened (NZ TCS)

Scientific classification
- Domain: Eukaryota
- Kingdom: Animalia
- Phylum: Arthropoda
- Subphylum: Chelicerata
- Class: Arachnida
- Order: Araneae
- Infraorder: Araneomorphae
- Family: Araneidae
- Genus: Zealaranea
- Species: Z. crassa

Binomial name
- Zealaranea crassa (Walckenaer, 1841)

Synonyms
- Epeira crassa; Epeira extuberata; Epeira undata; Epeira bi-albimacula; Epeira linea-acuta; Epeira purpura; Epeira dumicola; Epeira albo-stricta; Epeira guttatum; Epeira dubitabilis; Epeira albi-scutum; Epeira acincta; Epeira similaris; Epeira angusticlava; Araneus crassus; Araneus bialbimacula; Aranea purpurcolor

= Zealaranea crassa =

Species of Arachnida

Zealaranea crassa is a species of orb-weaver spider that is endemic to New Zealand.

== Taxonomy ==
This species was first described as Epeira crassa by Charles Walckenaer in 1841. It has undergone numerous revisions, but was mostly recently revised in 1988. The holotype location is unknown.

== Description ==
The female is recorded at 9.2mm in length whereas the male is 6.2mm. The colour patterns of the body are extremely variable

== Distribution ==
This species is known from throughout New Zealand.

== Conservation status ==
Under the New Zealand Threat Classification System, this species is listed as "Not Threatened".
