= Diploplecta nuda =

Conservation status
- Data Deficient (NZ TCS)

Scientific classification
- Domain: Eukaryota
- Kingdom: Animalia
- Phylum: Arthropoda
- Subphylum: Chelicerata
- Class: Arachnida
- Order: Araneae
- Infraorder: Araneomorphae
- Family: Linyphiidae
- Genus: Diploplecta
- Species: D. nuda

Binomial name
- Diploplecta nuda Millidge, 1988

Species of Arachnida

Diploplecta nuda is a species of Linyphiidae spider that is endemic to New Zealand.

== Taxonomy ==
This species was described in 1988 by Alfred Frank Millidge from a female specimen collected in Fiordland. The holotype is stored in Otago Museum.

== Description ==
The female is recorded at 2.1mm in length. This species has a pale brown carapace with black dorsal and lateral markings. The legs are yellow brown. The abdomen is uniform pale grey.

== Distribution ==
This species is only known from Homer in Fiordland, New Zealand.

== Conservation status ==
Under the New Zealand Threat Classification System, this species is listed as "Data Deficient" with the qualifiers of "Data Poor: Size", "Data Poor: Trend" and "One Location".
