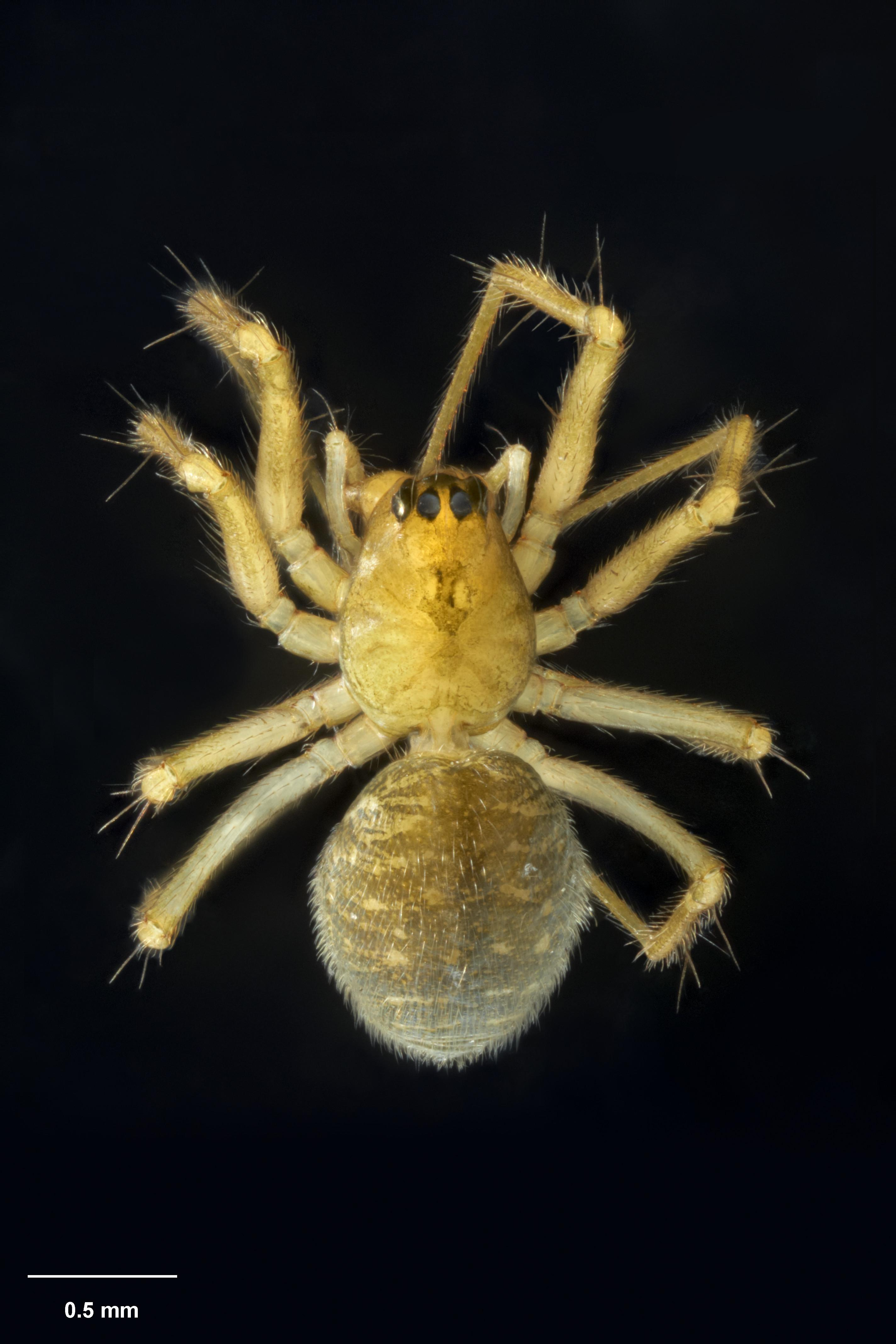

Conservation status
- Data Deficient (NZ TCS)

Scientific classification
- Domain: Eukaryota
- Kingdom: Animalia
- Phylum: Arthropoda
- Subphylum: Chelicerata
- Class: Arachnida
- Order: Araneae
- Infraorder: Araneomorphae
- Family: Linyphiidae
- Genus: Laetesia
- Species: L. atra

Binomial name
- Laetesia atra Blest & Vink, 2003

= Novalaetesia atra =

Species of spider

Novalaetesia atra is a species of sheet weaver spider endemic to New Zealand.

== Taxonomy ==
This species was described in 2003 by A.D. Blest and Cor Vink from a female specimen. The holotype is stored in Te Papa Museum under registration number AS.000330.

== Description ==
The female is recorded at 1.80mm in length. This species has a pale brown prosoma and legs. The abdomen is black.

== Distribution ==
This species is only known from Westland, New Zealand.

== Conservation status ==
Under the New Zealand Threat Classification System, this species is listed as "Data Deficient" with the qualifiers of "Data Poor: Size", "Data Poor: Trend" and "One Location".
