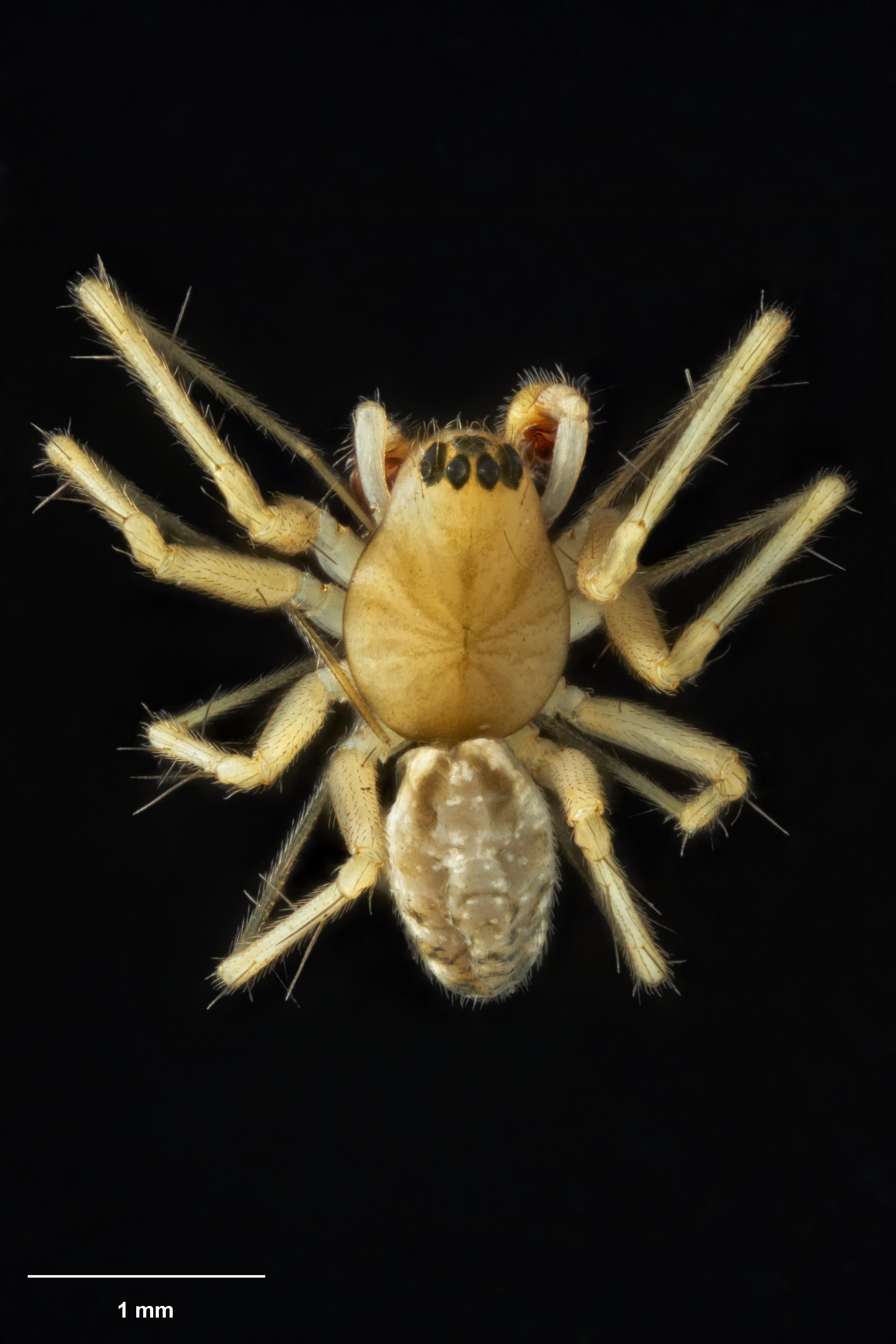

Conservation status
- Data Deficient (NZ TCS)

Scientific classification
- Domain: Eukaryota
- Kingdom: Animalia
- Phylum: Arthropoda
- Subphylum: Chelicerata
- Class: Arachnida
- Order: Araneae
- Infraorder: Araneomorphae
- Family: Linyphiidae
- Genus: Laetesia
- Species: L. pseudamoena

Binomial name
- Laetesia pseudamoena Blest & Vink, 2003

= Laetesia pseudamoena =

Species of spider

Laetesia pseudamoena is a species of sheet weaver endemic to New Zealand.

== Taxonomy ==
This species was described in 2003 by A.D. Blest and Cor Vink from male and female specimens. The holotype is stored in Te Papa Museum under registration number AS.000151.

== Description ==
The male is recorded at 2.5mm in length. This species has a pale brown prosoma with a dark medial stripe. The legs are pale brown. The abdomen is dark grey with pale spots.

== Distribution ==
This species is only known from Peel Forest in the South Island of New Zealand.

== Conservation status ==
Under the New Zealand Threat Classification System, this species is listed as "Data Deficient" with the qualifiers of "Data Poor: Size", "Data Poor: Trend" and "One Location".
