= Laetesia aucklandensis =

Conservation status
- Naturally Uncommon (NZ TCS)

Scientific classification
- Kingdom: Animalia
- Phylum: Arthropoda
- Subphylum: Chelicerata
- Class: Arachnida
- Order: Araneae
- Infraorder: Araneomorphae
- Family: Linyphiidae
- Genus: Laetesia
- Species: L. aucklandensis

Binomial name
- Laetesia aucklandensis (Forster, 1964)

Synonyms
- Linyphia aucklandensis

Species of spider

Laetesia aucklandensis is a species of sheet weaver found in the Auckland Islands.

== Taxonomy ==
This species was described as Linyphia aucklandensis in 1964 by Ray Forster from female and male specimens. It was most recently revised in 1988. The holotype is stored in Te Papa Museum under registration number AS.000007.

== Description ==
The female is recorded at 2.9-3.1mm in length whereas the male is 2.65-2.8mm. This species has an orange brown carapace and pale yellow to brown legs. The abdomen is white dorsally with some black markings.

== Distribution ==
This species is only known from the Auckland Islands in New Zealand.

== Conservation status ==
Under the New Zealand Threat Classification System, this species is listed as "Naturally Uncommon" with the qualifiers of "Island Endemic" and "Range Restricted".
