= Cryptaranea subalpina =

Conservation status
- Not Threatened (NZ TCS)

Scientific classification
- Domain: Eukaryota
- Kingdom: Animalia
- Phylum: Arthropoda
- Subphylum: Chelicerata
- Class: Arachnida
- Order: Araneae
- Infraorder: Araneomorphae
- Family: Araneidae
- Genus: Cryptaranea
- Species: C. subalpina

Binomial name
- Cryptaranea subalpina Court & Forster, 1988

Species of Arachnida

Cryptaranea subalpina is a species of orb-weaver spider that is endemic to New Zealand.

== Taxonomy ==
This species was described in 1988 by David Court and Ray Forster from female and male specimens collected in the South Island. The holotype is stored in Otago Museum.

== Description ==
The female is recorded at 6.6mm in length whereas the male is 5.4mm.

== Distribution ==
This species is only known from the south west of the South Island, New Zealand. It is restricted to subalpine zones.

== Conservation status ==
Under the New Zealand Threat Classification System, this species is listed as "Not Threatened".
