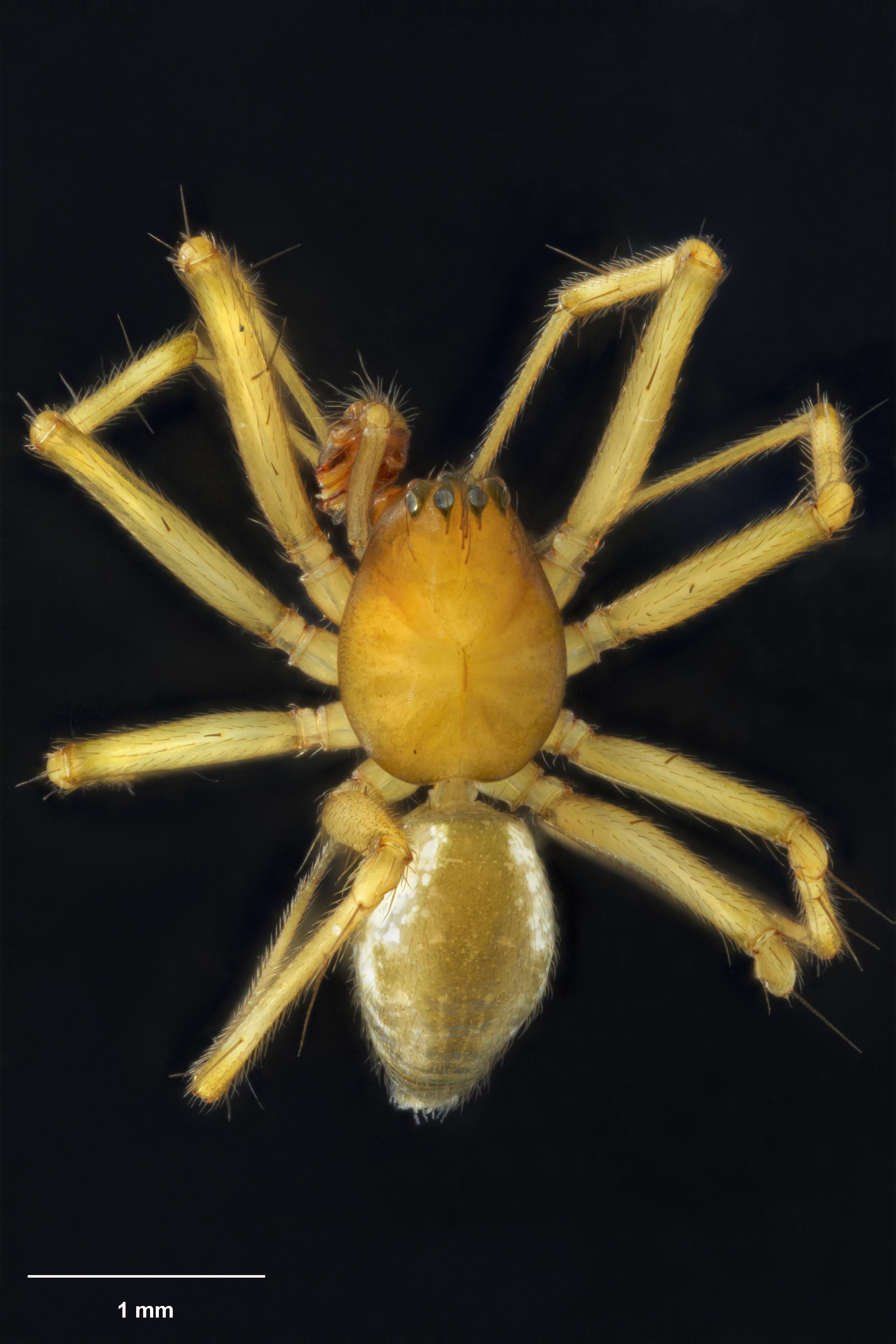

Conservation status
- Not Threatened (NZ TCS)

Scientific classification
- Domain: Eukaryota
- Kingdom: Animalia
- Phylum: Arthropoda
- Subphylum: Chelicerata
- Class: Arachnida
- Order: Araneae
- Infraorder: Araneomorphae
- Family: Linyphiidae
- Genus: Laetesia
- Species: L. intermedia

Binomial name
- Laetesia intermedia Blest & Vink, 2003

= Laetesia intermedia =

Species of spider

Laetesia intermedia is a species of sheet weaver found in New Zealand.

== Taxonomy ==
This species was described in 2003 by A.D. Blest and Cor Vink from male and female specimens. The holotype is stored in Te Papa Museum under registration number AS.000180.

== Description ==
The male is recorded at 2.6mm in length whereas the female is 3.05mm. This species has a dark brown prosoma, brown legs and a black abdomen that has white stripes laterally.

== Distribution ==
This species is only known from the North Island of New Zealand.

== Conservation status ==
Under the New Zealand Threat Classification System, this species is listed as "Not Threatened".
