= Laetesia asiatica =

Scientific classification
- Domain: Eukaryota
- Kingdom: Animalia
- Phylum: Arthropoda
- Subphylum: Chelicerata
- Class: Arachnida
- Order: Araneae
- Infraorder: Araneomorphae
- Family: Linyphiidae
- Genus: Laetesia
- Species: L. asiatica

Binomial name
- Laetesia asiatica Millidge, 1995

Species of spider

Laetesia asiatica is a species of sheet weaver found in Thailand. It was described by Millidge in 1995.
