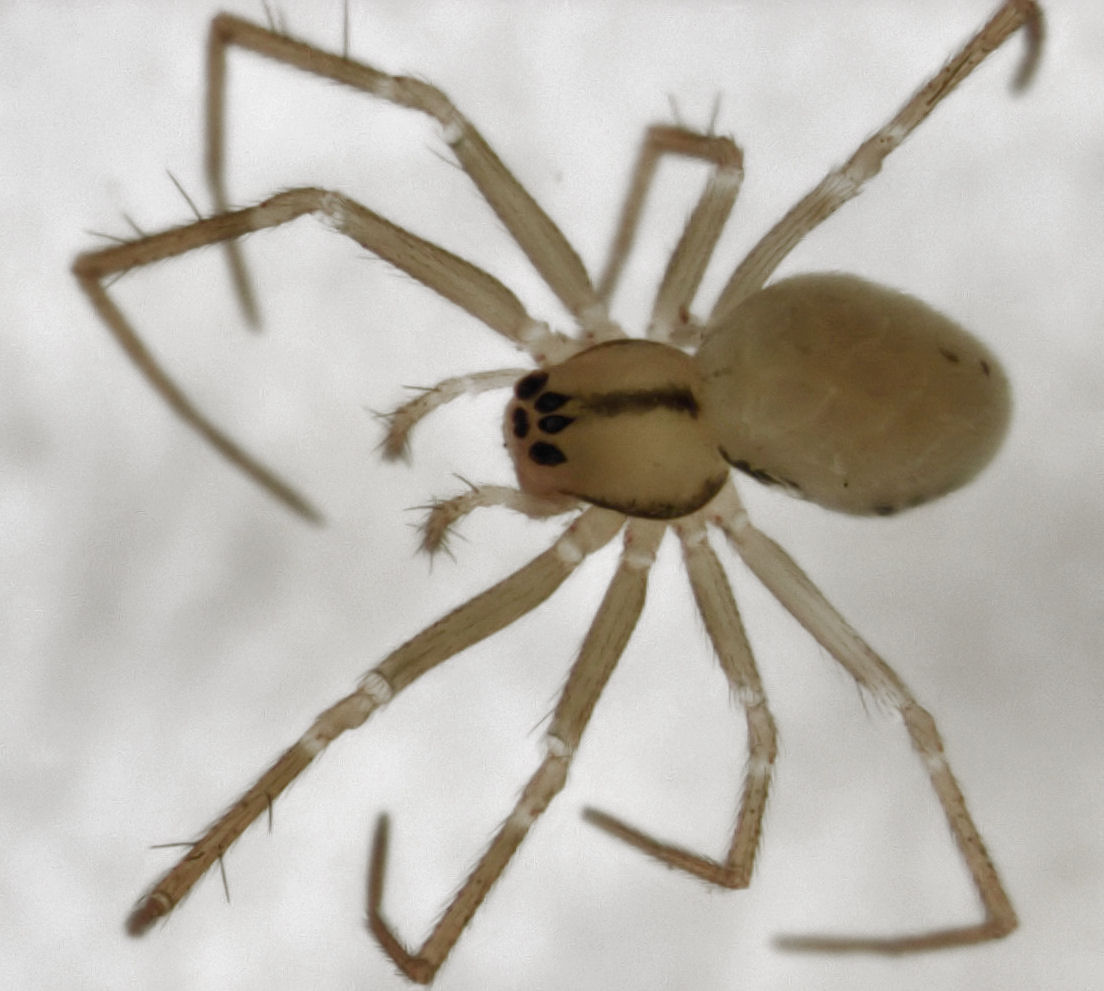
- Female Diploplecta australis
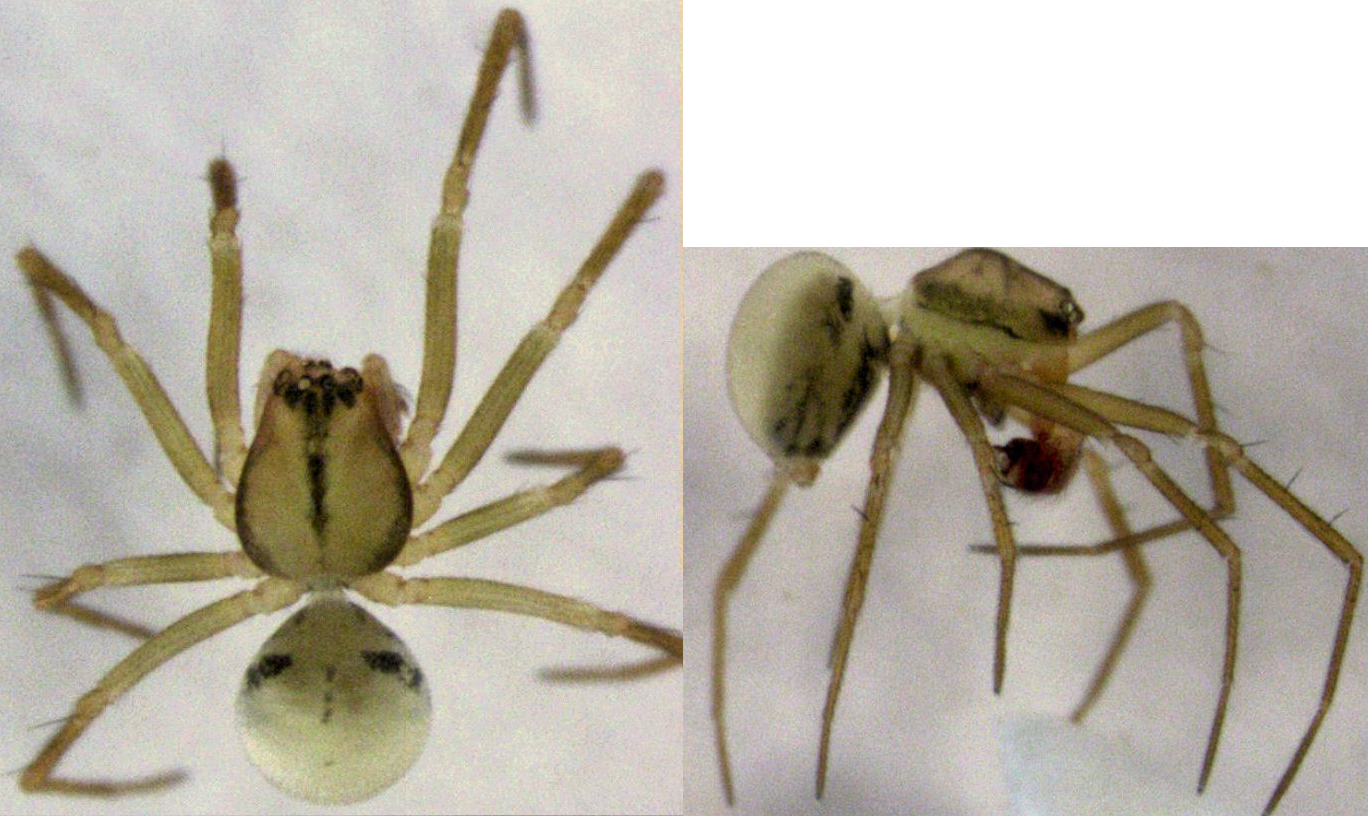
- Male Diploplecta australis

Conservation status
- Data Deficit (NZ TCS)

Scientific classification
- Kingdom: Animalia
- Phylum: Arthropoda
- Subphylum: Chelicerata
- Class: Arachnida
- Order: Araneae
- Infraorder: Araneomorphae
- Family: Linyphiidae
- Genus: Diploplecta
- Species: D. australis

Binomial name
- Diploplecta australis (Forster, 1955)

Synonyms
- Drapetisca australis

= Diploplecta australis =

Species of spider

Diploplecta australis is a spider in the family Linyphiidae. It is found in the Antipodes Islands.

== Taxonomy ==
The species was first described as Drapetisca australis in 1955 by Raymond R. Forster based on a female specimen only. It was transferred to Diplopecta by Fitzgerald, B. M. & Sirvid in 2020.

== Description ==
The total body length of the female is about 2.8 mm, with the first leg being the longest at about 5.4 mm. The carapace is pale yellow with a dark line in the centre and at the edges; the abdomen is paler with a short thin black line near the cephalothorax and two black patches in the middle of the underside.

== Distribution ==
This species is only known from Antipode Island in New Zealand.

== Conservation status ==
Under the New Zealand Threat Classification System, this species is listed as "Data Deficient" with the qualifiers of "Data Poor: Size", "Data Poor: Trend" and "One Location".
