= Laetesia nornalupiensis =

Scientific classification
- Kingdom: Animalia
- Phylum: Arthropoda
- Subphylum: Chelicerata
- Class: Arachnida
- Order: Araneae
- Infraorder: Araneomorphae
- Family: Linyphiidae
- Genus: Laetesia
- Species: L. nornalupiensis

Binomial name
- Laetesia nornalupiensis Wunderlich, 1976

Species of spider

Laetesia nornalupiensis is a species of sheet weaver spider found in Western Australia. It was described by Wunderlich in 1976.
