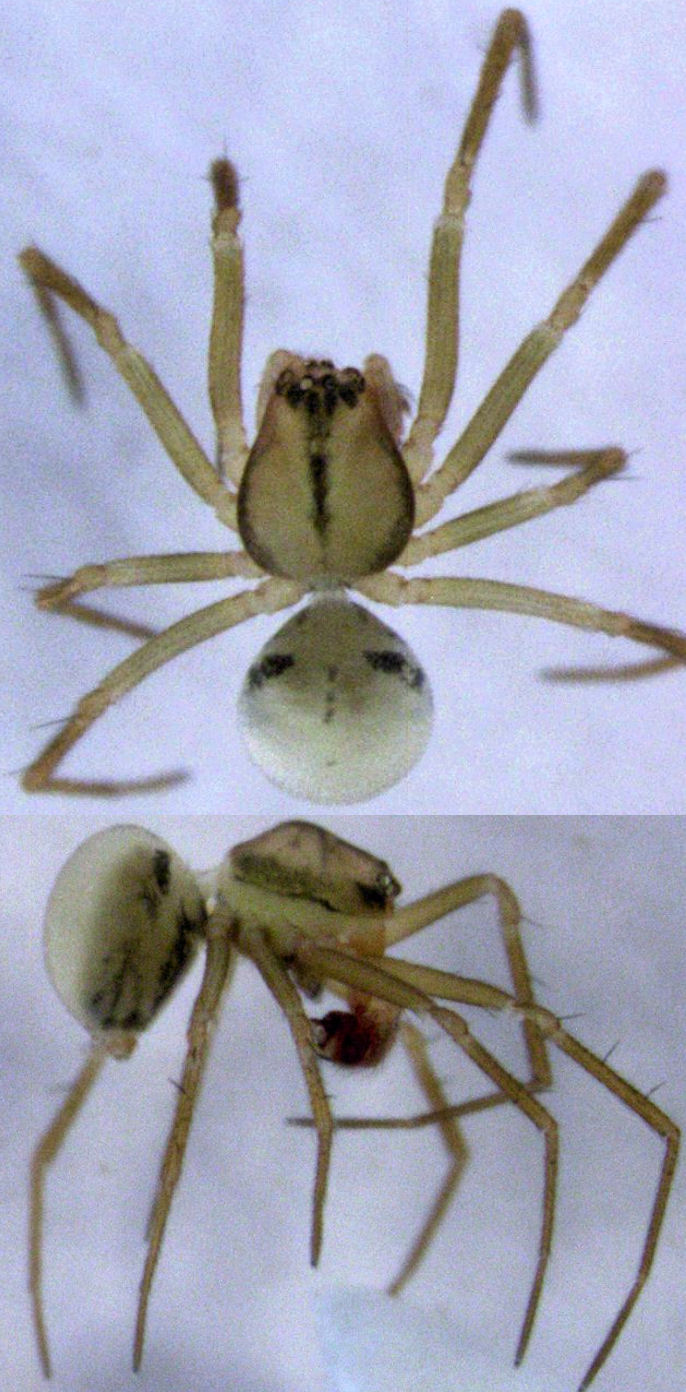
- Adult male Drapetisca australis

Scientific classification
- Kingdom: Animalia
- Phylum: Arthropoda
- Subphylum: Chelicerata
- Class: Arachnida
- Order: Araneae
- Infraorder: Araneomorphae
- Family: Linyphiidae
- Genus: Diploplecta; Millidge, 1988

Type species
- D. communis Millidge, 1988

Species
- 9, see text

= Diploplecta =

Genus of spiders

Diploplecta is a genus of South Pacific dwarf spiders that was first described by Alfred Frank Millidge in 1988.

== Species ==
As of May 2021 it contains nine species, all found in New Zealand:

- Diploplecta adjacens Millidge, 1988 – New Zealand
- Diploplecta australis (Forster, 1955) – New Zealand (Antipodes Is.)
- Diploplecta communis Millidge, 1988 (type) – New Zealand
- Diploplecta duplex Millidge, 1988 – New Zealand
- Diploplecta nuda Millidge, 1988 – New Zealand
- Diploplecta opaca Millidge, 1988 – New Zealand
- Diploplecta proxima Millidge, 1988 – New Zealand
- Diploplecta pumilio (Urquhart, 1886) – New Zealand
- Diploplecta simplex Millidge, 1988 – New Zealand
