= Diploplecta adjacens =

Conservation status
- Not Threatened (NZ TCS)

Scientific classification
- Domain: Eukaryota
- Kingdom: Animalia
- Phylum: Arthropoda
- Subphylum: Chelicerata
- Class: Arachnida
- Order: Araneae
- Infraorder: Araneomorphae
- Family: Linyphiidae
- Genus: Diploplecta
- Species: D. adjacens

Binomial name
- Diploplecta adjacens Millidge, 1988

Species of Arachnida

Diploplecta adjacens is a species of Linyphiidae spider that is endemic to New Zealand.

== Taxonomy ==
This species was described in 1988 by Alfred Frank Millidge from female specimens from Auckland and Nelson. The holotype is stored in the New Zealand Arthropod Collection under registration number NZAC03014968.

== Description ==
The female is recorded at 1.65mm in length. This species has a pale yellow cephalothorax with grey markings medially and laterally. The legs are pale orange-brown. The abdomen is pale yellow with dark markings.

== Distribution ==
This species is only known from Auckland and Nelson in New Zealand.

== Conservation status ==
Under the New Zealand Threat Classification System, this species is listed as "Not Threatened".
