= Laetesia chathami =

Conservation status
- Naturally Uncommon (NZ TCS)

Scientific classification
- Domain: Eukaryota
- Kingdom: Animalia
- Phylum: Arthropoda
- Subphylum: Chelicerata
- Class: Arachnida
- Order: Araneae
- Infraorder: Araneomorphae
- Family: Linyphiidae
- Genus: Laetesia
- Species: L. chathami

Binomial name
- Laetesia chathami Millidge, 1988

Species of spider

Laetesia chathami is a species of sheet weaver found in New Zealand.

== Taxonomy ==
This species was described in 1988 by Alfred Frank Millidge from a female specimen. The holotype is stored in the New Zealand Arthropod Collection under registration number NZAC03014977.

== Description ==
The female is recorded at 2.8mm in length. This species has an orange to dark brown mottled carapace. The legs are pale yellow. The abdomen is grey dorsally with dark chevrons.

== Distribution ==
This species is only known from Chatham Island, New Zealand.

== Conservation status ==
Under the New Zealand Threat Classification System, this species is listed as "Naturally Uncommon" with the qualifiers of "Island Endemic" and "Range Restricted".
