= Laetesia prominens =

Conservation status
- Not Threatened (NZ TCS)

Scientific classification
- Domain: Eukaryota
- Kingdom: Animalia
- Phylum: Arthropoda
- Subphylum: Chelicerata
- Class: Arachnida
- Order: Araneae
- Infraorder: Araneomorphae
- Family: Linyphiidae
- Genus: Laetesia
- Species: L. prominens

Binomial name
- Laetesia prominens Millidge, 1988

Species of spider

Laetesia prominens is a species of sheet weaver spider found in New Zealand.

== Taxonomy ==
This species was described in 1988 by Alfred Frank Millidge from female specimens. The holotype is stored in the New Zealand Arthropod Collection under registration number NZAC03014979.

== Description ==
The female is recorded at 1.6mm in length. This species has a pale yellow carapace with grey diffused in it. The legs are pale yellow to pale brown. The abdomen is grey dorsally with black chevrons and pale patches.

== Distribution ==
This species is only known from the North Island of New Zealand.

== Conservation status ==
Under the New Zealand Threat Classification System, this species is listed as "Not Threatened".
