= Laetesia peramoena =

Conservation status
- Not Threatened (NZ TCS)

Scientific classification
- Kingdom: Animalia
- Phylum: Arthropoda
- Subphylum: Chelicerata
- Class: Arachnida
- Order: Araneae
- Infraorder: Araneomorphae
- Family: Linyphiidae
- Genus: Laetesia
- Species: L. peramoena

Binomial name
- Laetesia peramoena (O. Pickard-Cambridge, 1879)

Synonyms
- Linyphia peramoena; Bathyphantes peramoenus

Species of spider

Laetesia peramoena is a species of sheet weaver endemic to New Zealand.

== Taxonomy ==
This species was described as Linyphia peramoena in 1879 by Octavius Pickard-Cambridge from male and female specimens. In 1988, it was transferred to the Laetesia genus. It was most recently revised in 2003.

== Description ==
The male is recorded at 3.0-3.2mm in length whereas the female is 2.8-3.0mm.

== Distribution ==
This species is only known from the South Island of New Zealand. This species has an orange carapace with a dark stripe medially. The legs yellow to pale brown. The abdomen is grey with white blotches.

== Conservation status ==
Under the New Zealand Threat Classification System, this species is listed as "Not Threatened".
