= Novalaetesia anceps =

Conservation status
- Relict (NZ TCS)

Scientific classification
- Domain: Eukaryota
- Kingdom: Animalia
- Phylum: Arthropoda
- Subphylum: Chelicerata
- Class: Arachnida
- Order: Araneae
- Infraorder: Araneomorphae
- Family: Linyphiidae
- Genus: Novalaetesia
- Species: N. anceps

Binomial name
- Novalaetesia anceps Millidge, 1988

Species of spider

Novalaetesia anceps is a species of sheet weaver endemic to New Zealand.

== Taxonomy ==
This species was described in 1988 by Alfred Frank Millidge from a female specimen. The holotype is stored in the Auckland War Memorial Museum under registration number AMNZ5062.

== Description ==
The female is recorded at 1.65mm in length. This species has a yellow brown carapace with dark markings. The legs are pale yellow brown. The abdomen is black dorsally with white blotches.

== Distribution ==
This species is only known from Mangonui in Northland, New Zealand.

== Conservation status ==
Under the New Zealand Threat Classification System, this species is listed as "Relict" with the qualifier of "One Location".
