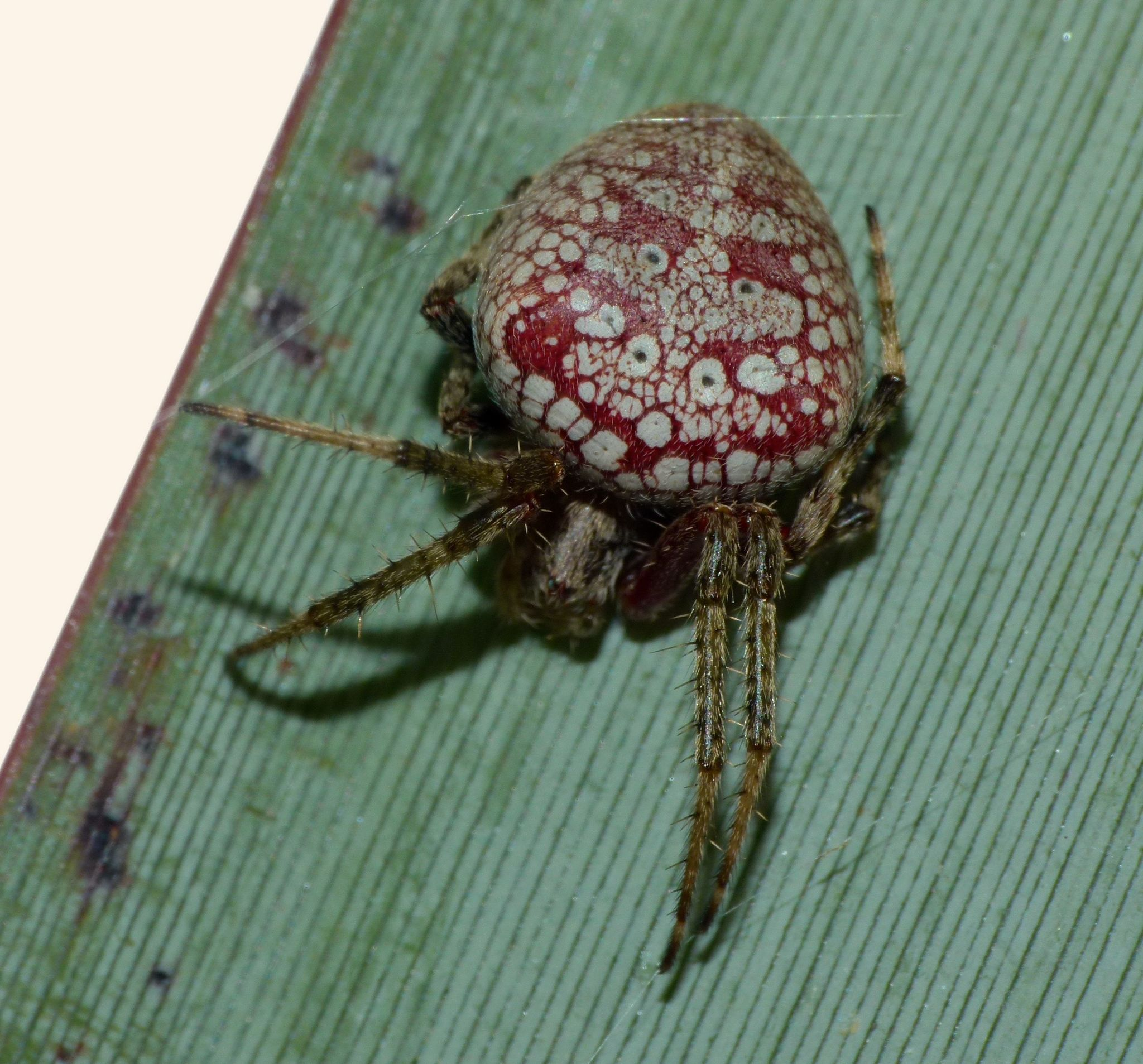

Conservation status
- Not Threatened (NZ TCS)

Scientific classification
- Domain: Eukaryota
- Kingdom: Animalia
- Phylum: Arthropoda
- Subphylum: Chelicerata
- Class: Arachnida
- Order: Araneae
- Infraorder: Araneomorphae
- Family: Araneidae
- Genus: Zealaranea
- Species: Z. prina

Binomial name
- Zealaranea prina Court & Forster, 1988

= Zealaranea prina =

Species of Arachnida

Zealaranea prina is a species of orb-weaver spider that is endemic to New Zealand.

== Taxonomy ==
This species was described in 1988 by David Court and Ray Forster from female and male specimens. The holotype is stored in Otago Museum.

== Description ==
The female is recorded at 8.3mm in length whereas the male is 5.4mm. The carapace is coloured orange brown and covered in pale hairs. The legs are pale yellow brown. The abdomen is quite variable but the base coloured is generally creamy and purpilish markings.

== Distribution ==
This species is known from throughout New Zealand.

== Conservation status ==
Under the New Zealand Threat Classification System, this species is listed as "Not Threatened".
