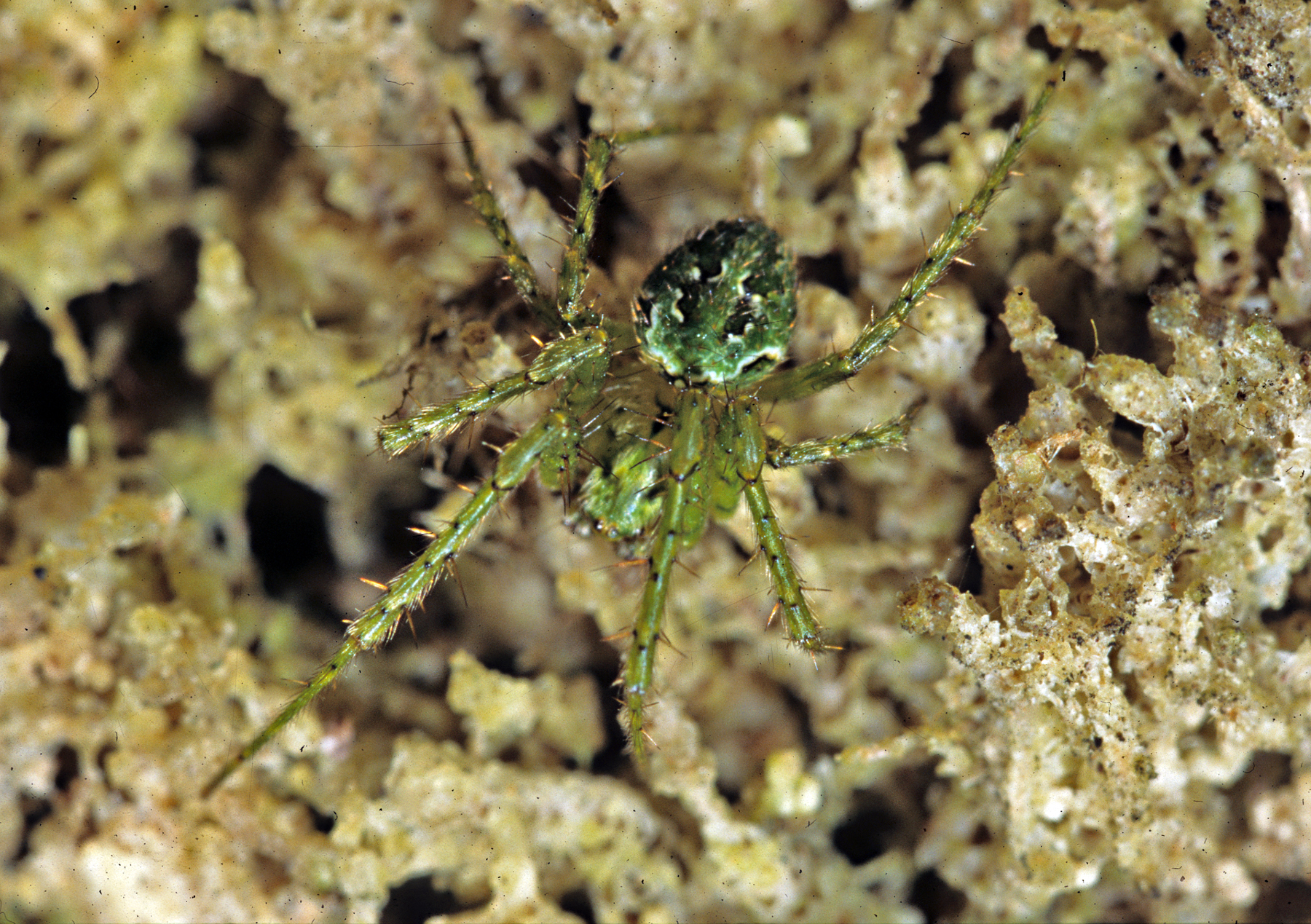
- Cryptaranea atrihastula

Scientific classification
- Kingdom: Animalia
- Phylum: Arthropoda
- Subphylum: Chelicerata
- Class: Arachnida
- Order: Araneae
- Infraorder: Araneomorphae
- Family: Araneidae
- Genus: Cryptaranea; Court & Forster, 1988

Type species
- C. invisibilis (Urquhart, 1892)

Species
- 7, see text

= Cryptaranea =

Genus of spiders

Cryptaranea is a genus of South Pacific orb-weaver spiders first described by D. J. Court & Raymond Robert Forster in 1988.

== Species ==
As of November 2026 it contains seven species, all found in New Zealand:

- Cryptaranea albolineata (Urquhart, 1893) – New Zealand
- Cryptaranea atrihastula (Urquhart, 1891) – New Zealand
- Cryptaranea invisibilis (Urquhart, 1892) – New Zealand
- Cryptaranea stewartensis Court & Forster, 1988 – New Zealand
- Cryptaranea subalpina Court & Forster, 1988 – New Zealand
- Cryptaranea subcompta (Urquhart, 1887) – New Zealand
- Cryptaranea venustula (Urquhart, 1891) – New Zealand
