= Laetesia germana =

Conservation status
- Data Deficient (NZ TCS)

Scientific classification
- Domain: Eukaryota
- Kingdom: Animalia
- Phylum: Arthropoda
- Subphylum: Chelicerata
- Class: Arachnida
- Order: Araneae
- Infraorder: Araneomorphae
- Family: Linyphiidae
- Genus: Laetesia
- Species: L. germana

Binomial name
- Laetesia germana Millidge, 1988

Species of spider

Laetesia germana is a species of sheet weaver endemic to New Zealand.

== Taxonomy ==
This species was described in 1988 by Alfred Frank Millidge from female and male specimens. The holotype is stored in Otago Museum.

== Description ==
The female is recorded at 2.65-2.9mm in length whereas the male is 2.45-2.65mm. This species has a yellow to orange carapace and legs. The female abdomen is yellowish grey with dark markings. In contrast the male abdomen is blackish with white markings dorsally.

== Distribution ==
This species is only known from the South Island of New Zealand.

== Conservation status ==
Under the New Zealand Threat Classification System, this species is listed as "Data Deficient" with the qualifiers of "Data Poor: Size" and "Data Poor: Trend".
