= Diploplecta communis =

Conservation status
- Not Threatened (NZ TCS)

Scientific classification
- Domain: Eukaryota
- Kingdom: Animalia
- Phylum: Arthropoda
- Subphylum: Chelicerata
- Class: Arachnida
- Order: Araneae
- Infraorder: Araneomorphae
- Family: Linyphiidae
- Genus: Diploplecta
- Species: D. communis

Binomial name
- Diploplecta communis Millidge, 1988

Species of Arachnida

Diploplecta communis is a species of Linyphiidae spider that is endemic to New Zealand.

== Taxonomy ==
This species was described in 1988 by Alfred Frank Millidge from female and male specimens. The holotype is stored in Otago Museum.

== Description ==
The female is recorded at 1.55-2mm in length whereas the male is 1.6-1.9mm. This species has a pale yellow to pale orange brown carapace with dark markings dorsally and laterally. The legs are pale yellow to pale brown. The abdomen is pale yellow with dark markings.

== Distribution ==
This species is widespread in New Zealand.

== Conservation status ==
Under the New Zealand Threat Classification System, this species is listed as "Not Threatened".
