= Laetesia amoena =

Conservation status
- Not Threatened (NZ TCS)

Scientific classification
- Domain: Eukaryota
- Kingdom: Animalia
- Phylum: Arthropoda
- Subphylum: Chelicerata
- Class: Arachnida
- Order: Araneae
- Infraorder: Araneomorphae
- Family: Linyphiidae
- Genus: Laetesia
- Species: L. amoena

Binomial name
- Laetesia amoena Millidge, 1988

Species of spider

Laetesia amoena is a species of sheet weaver found in New Zealand. It was described by Millidge in 1988.

== Taxonomy ==
This species was described in 1988 by Alfred Frank Millidge from female and male specimens. The holotype is stored in Otago Museum.

== Description ==
The female is recorded at 1.9-2.1mm in length whereas the male is 2.3-2.5mm. This species has a deep brown carapace that is darker along the fovea. The legs are brown to pale brown. The abdomen is mottled black dorsally.

== Distribution ==
This species is known throughout New Zealand.

== Conservation status ==
Under the New Zealand Threat Classification System, this species is listed as "Not Threatened".
