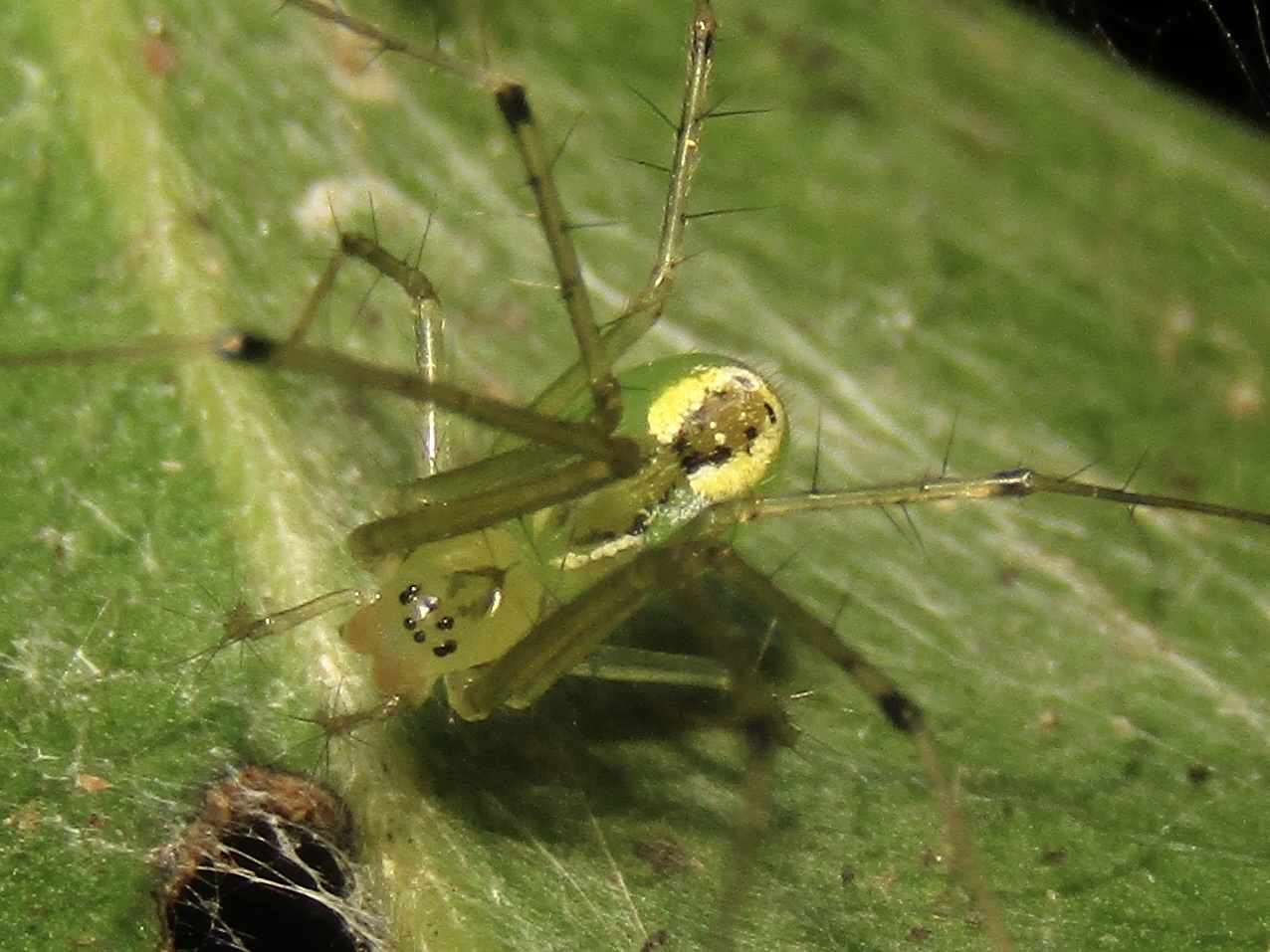
- Laetesia raveni

Scientific classification
- Kingdom: Animalia
- Phylum: Arthropoda
- Subphylum: Chelicerata
- Class: Arachnida
- Order: Araneae
- Infraorder: Araneomorphae
- Family: Linyphiidae
- Genus: Laetesia; Simon, 1908

Type species
- L. mollita Simon, 1908

Species
- 25, see text

= Laetesia =

Genus of spiders

Laetesia is a genus of dwarf spiders that was first described by Eugène Louis Simon in 1908.

== Species ==
As of May 2019 it contains twenty-five species, found in Australia, New Zealand, Thailand, and Vanuatu:

- Laetesia amoena Millidge, 1988 – New Zealand
- Laetesia asiatica Millidge, 1995 – Thailand
- Laetesia aucklandensis (Forster, 1964) – New Zealand (Auckland Is.)
- Laetesia bellissima Millidge, 1988 – New Zealand
- Laetesia chathami Millidge, 1988 – New Zealand
- Laetesia distincta Millidge, 1988 – New Zealand
- Laetesia egregia Simon, 1908 – Australia (Western Australia)
- Laetesia forsteri Wunderlich, 1976 – Australia (New South Wales)
- Laetesia germana Millidge, 1988 – New Zealand
- Laetesia intermedia Blest & Vink, 2003 – New Zealand
- Laetesia leo van Helsdingen, 1972 – Australia (South Australia)
- Laetesia minor Millidge, 1988 – New Zealand
- Laetesia mollita Simon, 1908 (type) – Australia (Western Australia)
- Laetesia nornalupiensis Wunderlich, 1976 – Australia (Western Australia)
- Laetesia oceaniae (Berland, 1938) – Vanuatu
- Laetesia olvidada Blest & Vink, 2003 – New Zealand
- Laetesia paragermana Blest & Vink, 2003 – New Zealand
- Laetesia peramoena (O. Pickard-Cambridge, 1880) – New Zealand
- Laetesia prominens Millidge, 1988 – New Zealand
- Laetesia pseudamoena Blest & Vink, 2003 – New Zealand
- Laetesia pulcherrima Blest & Vink, 2003 – New Zealand
- Laetesia raveni Hormiga & Scharff, 2014 – Australia (Queensland, New South Wales)
- Laetesia trispathulata (Urquhart, 1886) – New Zealand
- Laetesia weburdi (Urquhart, 1890) – Australia (New South Wales)
- Laetesia woomeraensis Wunderlich, 1976 – Australia (South Australia)
