= Arthur Urquhart =

New Zealand arachnologist

Arthur Torrane Urquhart (Switzerland, 27 October 1839 – Karaka, New Zealand, 3 October 1916) was an arachnologist and naturalist based in New Zealand.

== Biography ==
Urquhart was born in Switzerland in 1839. In 1856, he migrated to New Zealand and lived in a farm in Karaka. He produced eighteen taxonomic papers between 1882 and 1897.
