= H. Ronald Pulliam =

American ecologist and conservation biologist

- Citizenship: American
- Education: University of Georgia (B.S.); Duke University (Ph.D.)
- Known for: Optimal foraging theory; Source–sink dynamics
- Scientific career
- Fields: Ecology, Conservation biology
- Workplaces: University of Arizona; University of Georgia; SUNY Albany

H. Ronald Pulliam is an American ecologist and conservation biologist noted for his contributions to theoretical and applied ecology, including the development of the source–sink theory and advances in foraging theory. He is Regents Professor Emeritus at the Eugene P. Odum School of Ecology at the University of Georgia and the founder of the Borderlands Restoration Network and Wildlife Corridors, initiatives dedicated to restoring and conserving ecological connectivity in the U.S.–Mexico borderlands.

== Early life and education ==
Pulliam earned his Bachelor of Science in zoology from the University of Georgia in 1968 and his Ph.D. in ecology from Duke University in 1970, where he studied with Peter H. Klopfer. He then completed a National Science Foundation postdoctoral fellowship with Richard Lewontin at the University of Chicago (1970–1971).

== Academic career ==
Pulliam began his academic career at the University of Arizona in 1971, joining the Department of Zoology, and later established the Department of Ecology and Evolutionary Biology there, as well as serving on the faculty of Applied mathematics. He spent a sabbatical year with evolutionary biologist John Maynard Smith at Sussex University (1977–1978).

On his return from the UK, Pulliam served as head ecologist at the Museum of Northern Arizona, held professorships at the State University of New York (SUNY-Albany) and the University of Georgia. There, he directed the Institute of Ecology from 1987 to 1993 and was appointed Regents Professor in 1997.

From 1993 to 1996, Pulliam served as Director of the National Biological Service within the United States Department of the Interior, where he worked to integrate ecological research into federal environmental management. He later served as Science Advisor to the United States Secretary of the Interior (1996–1997). In addition, he has served on numerous editorial boards, including Ecology, Ecological Monographs, and Ecological Applications.

== Research contributions ==
Pulliam is best known for his pioneering work on optimal foraging theory and source–sink population dynamics, both of which have had impacts on theoretical and applied ecology. His 1988 paper “Sources, Sinks, and Population Regulation” in The American Naturalist introduced a framework that reshaped the understanding of population ecology and landscape conservation. Earlier, his work with Eric Charnov and Graham Pyke on Optimal Foraging: A Selected Review of Theory and Tests (1977) became a foundational reference in behavioral ecology.

In addition to his theoretical contributions, Pulliam has written extensively on conservation biology, sustainable landscapes, and the interface between ecology and public policy. His research integrates population dynamics, habitat selection, and ecosystem management across spatial scales.

== Conservation leadership ==
In 2013, he founded the Borderlands Restoration Network (BRN) in Patagonia, Arizona, a collaborative non-profit dedicated to ecological restoration in the Madrean Sky Islands region. As Managing Partner of Wildlife Corridors since 2011, he has promoted the restoration of habitat connectivity and community-based conservation along the U.S.–Mexico borderlands. His leadership in this field earned him the 2023 Buddy Amos Founders Award from the Community Foundation for Southern Arizona.

== Professional service ==
Pulliam has served as President (1991–1992) and Vice President (1986–1987) of the Ecological Society of America. He has also been a trustee of the Georgia Conservancy, Vice President for Global Change Studies at the Southeastern Universities Research Association, and chair or member of numerous governmental and scientific advisory committees, including the U.S. Office of Science and Technology Policy Committee on Environment and Natural Resources, and the boards of Defenders of Wildlife, NatureServe, and the National Council for Science and the Environment.

== Awards and honors ==
- Buddy Amos Founders Award, Community Foundation for Southern Arizona (2023)
- Distinguished Landscape Ecologist Award, International Association for Landscape Ecology (2005)
- Distinguished Service Award, Ecological Society of America (2002)
- Regents Professor, University of Georgia (1997)
- Earl Greene Award, Georgia Ornithological Society

== Selected publications ==
- Pulliam, H. R. (1973). "On the Advantages of Flocking." Journal of Theoretical Biology, 38(2): 419–422.
- Pyke, G. H., Pulliam, H. R., & Charnov, E. L. (1977). "Optimal Foraging: A Selected Review of Theory and Tests." Quarterly Review of Biology, 52: 137–154.
- Pulliam, H. R. (1988). "Sources, Sinks, and Population Regulation." The American Naturalist, 135: 652–661.
- Pulliam, H. R., & Dunning, J. B. (1994). "Demographic Processes: Population Dynamics on Heterogeneous Landscapes." In Principles of Conservation Biology. Sinauer Associates.
- Pulliam, H. R. (2000). "On the Relationship Between Niche and Distribution." Ecology Letters, 3: 349–361.
- Diez, J. M., Giladi, I., Warren, R., & Pulliam, H. R. (2014). "Probabilistic and Spatially Variable Niches Inferred from Demography." Journal of Ecology, 102(2): 544–554.
- Norman, L. M., Girard, M., Pulliam, H. R., et al. (2020). "Combining the Science and Practice of Restoration Ecology." Air, Soil and Water Research, 14: 1–9.
