= Central place foraging =

Central place foraging (CPF) theory is an evolutionary ecology model for analyzing how an organism can maximize foraging rates while traveling through a patch (a discrete resource concentration), but maintains the key distinction of a forager traveling from a home base to a distant foraging location rather than simply passing through an area or travelling at random. CPF was initially developed to explain how red-winged blackbirds might maximize energy returns when traveling to and from a nest. The model has been further refined and used by anthropologists studying human behavioral ecology and archaeology.

== Case studies ==
=== Central place foraging in non-human animals ===
Orians and Pearson (1979) found that red-winged blackbirds in eastern Washington State tend to capture a larger number of single species prey items per trip compared to the same species in Costa Rica, which brought back large, single insects. Foraging specialization by Costa Rican blackbirds was attributed to increased search and handling costs of nocturnal foraging, whereas birds in Eastern Washington forage diurnally for prey with lower search and handling costs. Studies with sea birds and seals have also found that load size tends to increase with foraging distance from the nest, as predicted by CPF. Other central place foragers, such as social insects, also show support for CPF theory. European honeybees increase their nectar load as travel time to nectar sites from a hive increases. Beavers have been found to preferentially collect larger diameter trees as distance from their lodge increases.

=== Archaeological case study: acorns and mussels in California ===
To apply the central place foraging model to ethnographic and experimental archaeological data driven by middle range theory, Bettinger et al. (1997) simplify the Barlow and Metcalf (1996) central place model to explore the archaeological implications of acorn (Quercus kelloggii) and mussel (Mytilus californianus) procurement and processing. This model assumes foragers are gathering resources at a distance from their central place with the goal of efficiently returning the resource home. Travel time is expected to determine the degree to which foragers will process a resource in order to increase its utility prior to returning from a foraging location to their central place. Transport capabilities in aboriginal California were established by measuring the volume of burden baskets and extrapolating the load weight based on ethnographic data on basket use.

Ethnographic and experimental data was used to estimate utility at each possible stage of processing. Examining ecology and procurement methods, the central place foraging model was used to predict the conditions in which field processing of the two species will occur.

- Acorn: Most stages of acorn processing are extremely time consuming but only marginally increase utility, therefore the central place foraging model predicts that acorns should only be dried prior to transporting to central place. Further processing of acorns (cracking, shucking, and winnowing) increases efficiency only when foragers’ one way travel time reaches 25 hours. This corresponds to approximately 124.75 km, which exceeds the territory size of native groups in California dependent on acorns.
- Mussels: When foragers employ the plucking harvesting method, field processing is expected even with short travel distances, as the shell to meat ratio allows forager to increase efficiency by removing shell. Stripping will almost always result in central place processing, rather than field processing, as this harvesting method results in the procurement of a high percentage of small mussels with high shell to meat ratios.

An understanding of central place foraging has implications for studying archaeological site formation. Variability of remains at sites can tell us about mobility – whether or not groups are central place foragers, what resource they’re mapping on to, and their degree of mobility. Based on central place foraging application for the processing of mussels and acorns, Bettinger et al. (1997) make several predictions for archaeological expectations. The study shows that procurement with field processing is more costly compared to foraging and processing resources residentially. These results imply that highly mobile foragers will establish a home base in close proximity to staple resources, and all processing of those resources will be done residentially. Less residentially mobile populations would in turn be mapped only onto a few resources, and would be expected to field process non-local resources on logistical procurement forays at greater distances from their central place. Processing debris from archaeological sites should reflect changes in mobility.

- Acorns: Sites where the archaeobotanical remains are dominated by acorn can be assumed to be seasonal sites of highly mobile foragers that have mapped on to acorns for seasonal processing. Sites that have a mix of archaeobotanical remains with a decreased abundance in acorn remains and plant material that would be lost in early stages of field processing are interpreted as less residentially mobile settlements characterized by logistical procurement.
- Mussels: Interpretation of archaeological mussel shell is complicated because it is reliant on the condition of the mussel beds, distance to the mussel beds and the type of harvest method being employed. In general, however, sites closer to mussel beds should have larger mussel shell due to plucking and residential consumption. Sites far from mussel procurement beds would be expected to have a mix of mussel shell sizes due to stripping. The presence of higher amounts of small mussel shell could also indicate an increase in resource intensification.

=== Archaeological case study: silver miners and propaganda in Colorado ===
Glover (2009) used a CPF model to determine if late nineteenth century silver miners near Gothic, Colorado were choosing mine locations efficiently given the costs of transporting silver ore to the mill, the value of silver, and the amount of silver per kilogram of ore. Estimates of the costs associated with transport were obtained using research from physiology to determine the most energetically efficient load size. Newspaper articles were used to determine the hourly wage that a miner could be making if they worked in town instead. Newspapers were also used to estimate the value of silver at that time, and estimates of the amount of silver per kilogram of ore were obtained through records from area silver mills, as well as through newspapers. These differed, with the newspapers optimistically claiming that silver deposits were far more productive than the more accurate mill records demonstrated.

These estimates were used to determine the optimal placement of mines. A number of historic mining locations were recorded using GPS. These data were used to calculate least cost paths from the mines to Gothic, which provided the distances to the central place. The results were compared to two different CPF models based on newspaper propaganda and the more realistic mill records, respectively.

Miners were choosing locations that were much farther away than feasible given the value of silver and its actual abundance. However, the mines were within the distance predicted using the optimistic newspaper estimates. Glover suggested that miners, being new to the area, used social learning strategies and based their decisions on newspaper propaganda and rumors, rather than individual experience. Therefore, they chose locations that were too far away to be economically viable.

=== Ethnographic case study: shellfish in Torres Strait Islands ===
Shellfish exemplify the resources targeted by the CPF model – those with a heavy, bulky, low utility component (e.g. shell) surrounding a smaller, lighter high utility component (e.g. meat). If foragers differentially field process and transport shellfish prey items, analyses of midden composition may incorrectly estimate the importance of some species and their relative contribution to prehistoric diets. Using foraging data from the Meriam of Australia, Bird and Bliege Bird (1997) compare observed shellfish field acquisition to shell deposition at residential sites, and test the hypotheses of the CPF model.

The Meriam inhabit Torres Strait Islands of Australia, are of Melanesian descent, and have strong cultural and historical ties to New Guinea. They continue to harvest marine resources such as sea turtles, fishes, squid, and shellfish. Bird and Bliege Bird conducted “focal individual foraging follows” of 33 children, 16 men and 42 women during intertidal foraging bouts on reef flats and rock shores. Foraging technology includes 10- liter plastic buckets, long-blade knives, and hammers. Foragers are constrained by time (2–4 hours at low tide) and load size (10-liter bucket).

Large clams (Hippopus hippopus and Tridacna spp.) collected on the reef flat constitute over half of the edible weight collected, but since they are almost always field processed their shells make up only 10% of the residential site deposition. In contrast, sunset clams (Asaphis violascens) and nerites (Nerita undata) are usually processed residentially. Large clams were, therefore, underrepresented while small clams and nerites were overrepresented in the reconstructed diet.

Since reef flat and rocky shore foraging occurs at multiple sites at variable distances from the residential camp, the authors calculated the mean one-way travel distance processing threshold ($z_{d1}$, in meters) for each species. The CPF model accurately predicts field processing for the majority of reef flat foraging events for bivalves. Hippopus and Tridacna have small processing threshold distances ($z_{d1}$ = 74.6 and 137 respectively), and no shell is returned to camp at distances beyond 150 meters. Women’s fit nears 100%, but children and men made the optimal choice less frequently because they usually forage for shellfish opportunistically, and therefore do not always carry the appropriate processing technology.

For gastropods (Lambis lambis, $z_{d1}$ = 278.7), the model accurately predicts processing only 58-59% of the time. This could in part be due to a preference for cooking some species inside of their shells (i.e. the shell has some utility), or also because some prey items are prepared at “dinner-time camps” rather than the residential camp. A. violascens and N. undata are never field processed, consistent with their large processing threshold distances (2418.5 and 5355.7 respectively).

Overall, prey types that were difficult or inefficient to process and/or were collected near the residential or temporary camp were not field processed. Species that required little processing time to increase returns and/or were collected far from camp were field processed. The field processing predictions of the CPF model might be incorrect where shellfish are transported whole in order to maintain freshness for later consumption or trade, or where the shell itself is valuable.

=== Ethnoarchaeological case study: pickleweed and piñon ===
Barlow and Metcalfe (1996) address the issues of field processing of plant materials. Decisions of central place foragers may confound archaeological interpretations about the contribution plant material to the diet. Two interrelated issues are pertinent: the location of the central place, and field processing.

Barlow and Metcalfe study archaeological materials from two sites, Danger Cave and Hogup Cave, in the area of the Great Salt Lake. These sites contain evidence for the use of piñon pine (Pinus monophylla) and pickleweed (Allenrolfea occidentalis).

Samples were obtained for experimental processing from extant piñon groves and pickleweed patches in the vicinity as the cave sites. Piñon and pickleweed were harvested and processed in carefully timed and controlled stages. After each stage the useful, i.e. edible, portion of the remaining material was weighed and recorded before proceeding to the next stage. Stages consisted of: gathering, drying, and a variety of processes (parching, hulling, winnowing, etc.) to remove inedible constituents. Caloric values of the samples were then determined via laboratory analysis. These values, as well as assumed load sizes from 3 to 15 kg (based on ethnographic burden basket sizes) were then used to generate field processing model predictions.

At a distance of 15 kilometers from the central place, the estimated net return rates for field processing loads of piñon and pickleweed are 3,000 and 190 calories per hour, respectively. Since piñon has higher overall return rates, field processing produces a higher rate of return. Because pickleweed has a lower rate of return, it is not worthwhile to spend the additional effort required for field processing. Therefore, the central place will be situated closer to pickleweed patches than to piñon in order to more effectively exploit the lower-ranked resource.

These results imply that the archaeological evidence for pickleweed at the cave may over estimate its actual contribution to the diet. If foragers choose to reside closer to pickleweed patches and bring back largely unprocessed plants, a high density of pickleweed macrofossils will be incorporated into site deposits. However, the opposite is true for piñon, which is largely processed in the field. Thus, most sites will contain little macrofossil evidence of the inedible portions of piñon that could later be recovered by archaeologists. As such, the relative abundance of macrofossils in most cases does not directly translate into the relative contribution of those resources to the diet of central place foragers.

== The model ==
=== Basic math: single stage of processing ===
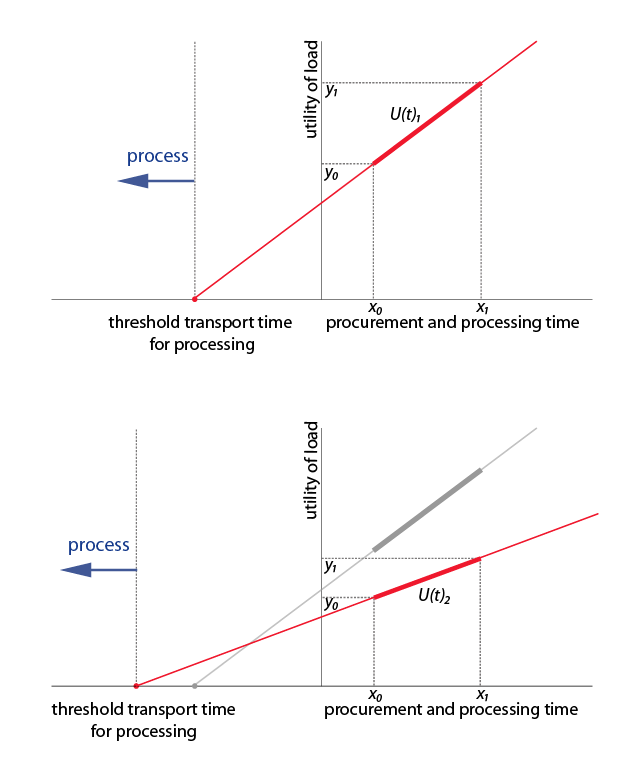
The effect of flattening the utility curve, $U(t)$ whilekeeping constant procurement and processing times $(x_0,x_1)$. When the difference between field processing and transporting whole items $(y_1,y_0)$ is reduced, we should expect an increase in the transport time atwhich processing will occur. A forager should process items when transport time from a central place exceeds this threshold. (Adapted from Metcalfe and Barlow 1992.)

The goal of the field processing model is for a forager to maximize its return rate per roundtrip from home base to patch. The model typically solves for some amount of travel time that makes it worthwhile to process a resource to a certain stage. To determine this, we need to relate the benefit of processing and the time spent processing to the travel time. We let

$z=$ point on transport-time axis where field processing become profitable

$x_0=$ time to procure unprocessed resources

$x_1=$ time to procure and process a load of resources

$y_0=$ utility of load without field processing

$y_1=$ utility of load with field processing

The relationship is then specified by:

$z=\frac{y_0x_1-y_1x_0}{y_1-y_0}$

With values for the utility and time of processed $(y_1,x_1)$ and unprocessed loads $(y_0,x_0)$, we can solve for $z$. The right hand side of the equation is the proportion of relative utility*time to utility. Two conditions must be satisfied. First, the processed load must have higher utility than the unprocessed load. Second, the return rate of the unprocessed load must be at least as good as the return rate for the processed load. Formally,

If $x_1>x_0$ then $y_1>y_0$.

If $y_0<y_1$, then $\frac{y_0}{x_0}\geq\frac{y_1}{x_1}$.

=== Multiple components and multiple stages of processing ===
Many resources have multiple components that can be removed during processing to increase utility. Multistage field processing models provide a way to calculate travel thresholds for each stage when a resource has more than one component. As one increases the utility per load, the time needed to procure a complete load increases.

The benefit of each stage of processing is:

$y_j=\frac{\sum_{i\in s_j}A_iB_i}{\sum_{i\in s_j}B_i}$

where

$A_j=$utility of resource component j

$B_j=$proportion of package composed of resource component j prior to processing

$y_j=$utility of load at field-processing stage j

The cost in terms of time for each stage of processing is:

$x_j=\left(\frac{L}{P\sum_{i\in s_j}B_i}\right)\left(M+\sum_{i\notin s_j}D_i\right)$

where

$D_j=$time required to remove resource component j

$L=$weight of optimal load size for transport

$P=$weight of unmodified resource package

$M=$time required to handle each resource package

$x_j=$total handling and processing time required to reach each stage j of processing

Now these values can be used to calculate $z_j$, which is the travel threshold for processing to stage j. In addition to a resource with multiple components, this same model generalizes to a resource with multiple stages, each of which is composed of multiple resources, each of which can be removed independently of each other (i.e., with no additional cost). This model can be further generalized to the case where multiple components with additional costs can be removed in multiple stages of processing through recursion.

=== Assumptions ===
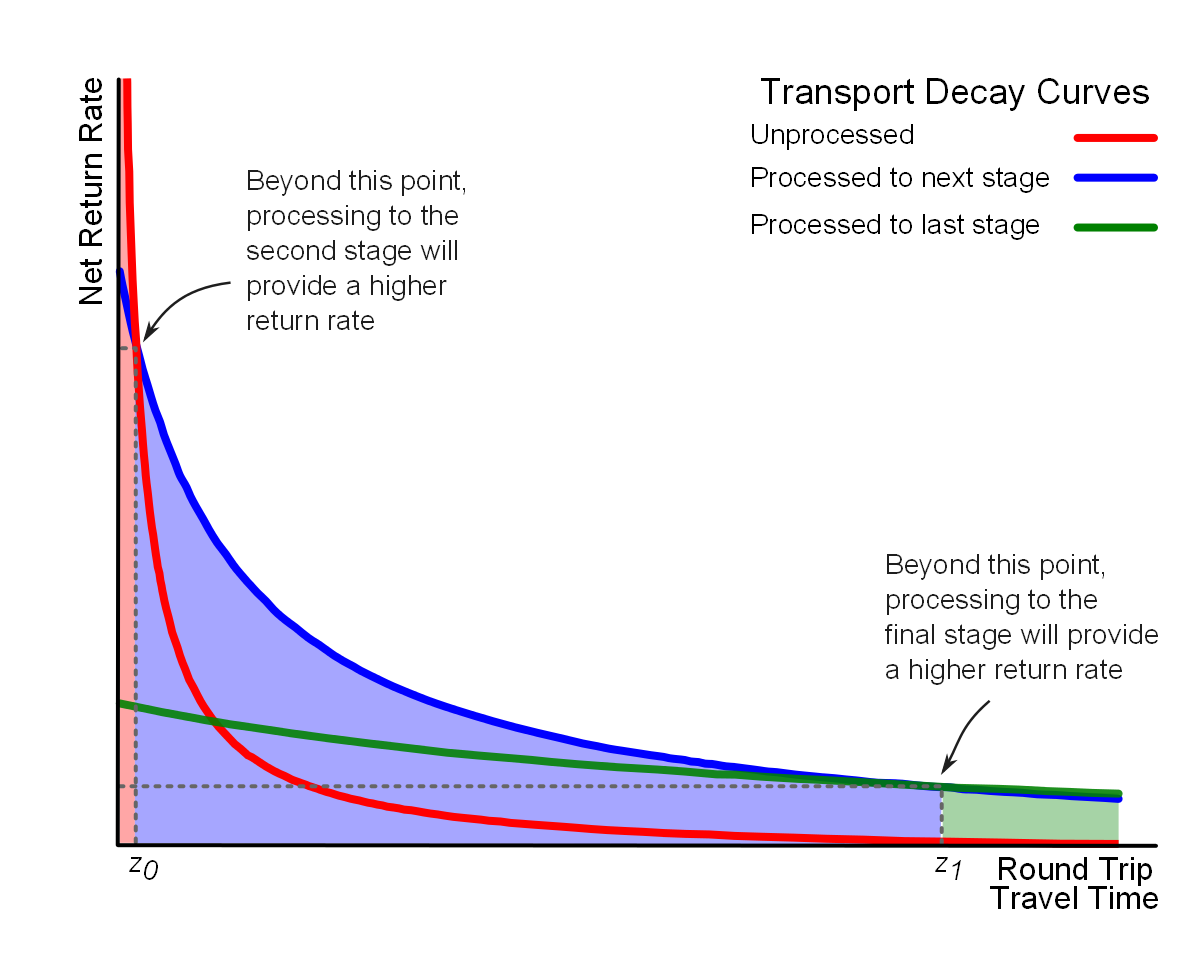
Transport decay curves demonstrate the reduction in return rates (cal/hour) experienced by a central place forager as a function of round trip travel time. The travel threshold from field processing models, $z_j$ represents the travel time at which processing to the next stage will provide higher return rates, which is indicated by the intersection of the decay curves for two sequential stages of processing. The shaded areas represent the optimal extent of processing as travel time increases.

This model rests on a number of assumptions. The most important are listed here.

- Individuals attempt to maximize their rate of delivery per round trip * Packages have at least two components with different utilities
- The optimal load size is less than or equal to the resources available
- Time spent away from camp comes with an opportunity cost, but time spent in camp does not. So there is no cost to processing in camp.

=== Predictions ===
There are three key predictions from the field processing model.

1. The amount an individual is willing to process is proportional to traveling time. This is evident in $x_0$ and $x_1$ in the equation above. Since $x_1$ is the amount of time it takes an individual to process something to an additional stage, and this is independent of the amount of time it takes one to initially procure the resources, and since $x_1$ is positive, then increasing it will result in an increase in $z$.
2. If processing results in a greater benefit, then one will not need to travel as far to make processing worthwhile. This is clear to see because, as long as condition 2 holds, $y_1$ is larger than $y_0$. So that part of the equation will be negative. Therefore, if we hold everything else the same and increase the benefit due to processing, the travel time required to make processing viable will decrease.
3. Field processing can increase the amount of time that an individual is willing to pursue a prey. If processing a prey item results in a big enough benefit, you will spend longer capturing it. We can see this by looking at where $x_0$ is in this model. Since it interacts with the benefit due to processing, a change in either of those can alter $z$.
4. Central place foraging predicts that foragers will optimize their routes and resource collection strategies based on the distance and profitability of resources relative to their central location, aiming to maximize their energy gain while minimizing travel costs. Processing efficiency may vary based on environmental conditions, such as resource abundance or scarcity, influencing the overall foraging strategy.

Transport decay curves demonstrate the reduction in return rates (cal/hour) experienced by a central place forager as a function of round trip travel time.

== See also ==
- Optimal foraging theory
