= Primate foraging =

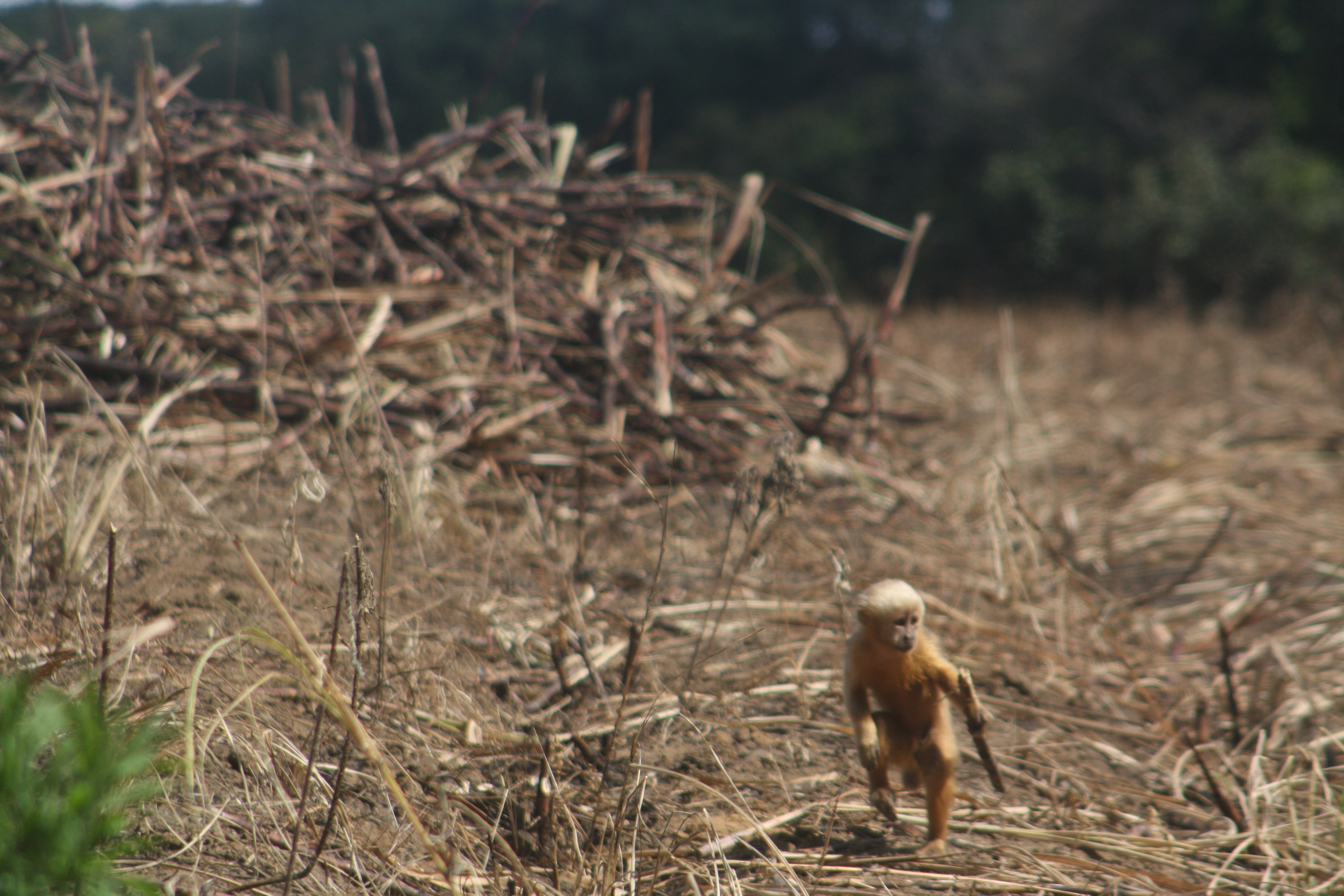
A blond capuchin monkey (Sapajus flavius) runs across a dry sugarcane field, carrying a stalk of sugarcane in one hand.

Primate species exhibit several foraging strategies that are shaped by their ecological environments, social structures, and nutritional needs. These strategies are crucial for their survival and reproductive success, as they navigate complex environments to locate and acquire food. The foraging behaviors of primates are further influenced by spatial, temporal, and social factors, and they often employ cognitive skills to optimize their food acquisition.

== Spatial foraging ==
Primates use mental maps to remember the location of food resources, allowing them to plan goal-oriented paths to these resources. Spatial memory is important in environments where food availability is seasonal and unpredictable.

== Optimal foraging ==
Primate foraging strategies are influenced by the need to balance nutrient intake. Theories such as energy maximization and minimization have been proposed to explain their dietary choices.

=== Energy maximization and minimization ===
Primates living in seasonal or fragmented environments must balance energy expenditure with food intake. This typically results in different foraging strategies, commonly categorized as either energy maximization, expanding space use to seek high-quality foods, or energy minimization, reducing movement and activity to conserve energy during periods of scarcity.

Some examples of those strategies being adopted can be seen in Black-fronted titi monkeys (Callicebus nigrifrons) that they minimize their energy use during low fruit availability by decreasing travel distances and diversifying their diet. In a fragmented landscape, Alouatta caraya groups adopted different strategies: island groups relied on fallback foods and minimized space use, while mainland groups expanded their ranges. Propithecus diadema, a folivorous lemur, increases movement during low food availability, while Eulemur fulvus, a frugivore, expand its range to maximize food intake. Cebus olivaceus in Venezuela expand their home range during food shortages, pursuing an energy maximization strategy. Cebus capucinus in Costa Rica expand their space use during scarcity, but reduce movement near water sources during hotter months

== Social and behavioral aspects ==
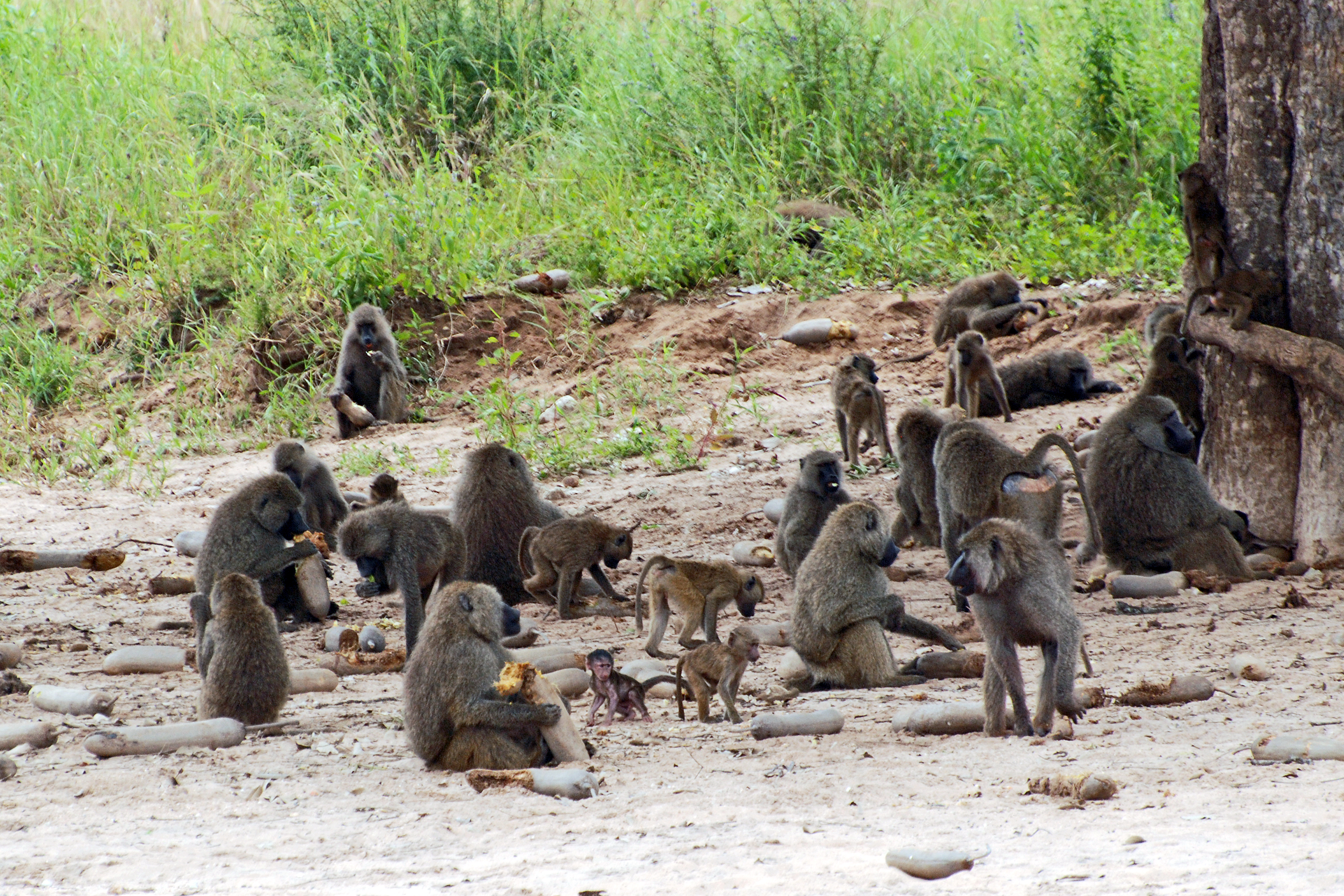
A group of olive baboons (Papio anubis) foraging in Laikipia, Kenya. Juvenile often develop their foraging skills by observing older group members.

Social factors like feeding competition and dominance hierarchies play roles in primate foraging behavior. In some species, females may have priority access to food resources, which can influence group dynamics. The Marginal Value Theorem has been applied to understand how primates make decisions regarding when to leave a food-rich area and balancing the rate of resource intake with the time spent in that place.

Juveniles develop foraging skills by observing and mimicking the behavior of older or more experienced group members. This social process helps young individuals identify safe and nutritious foods, increasing their foraging efficiency over time.

Group size in primates is limited by the time available for foraging and the energetic benefits of food locations. If a group becomes too large, competition can increase travel costs, reducing foraging efficiency. This can lead to fission–fusion behavior as a strategy to manage these constraints.

== Tools ==
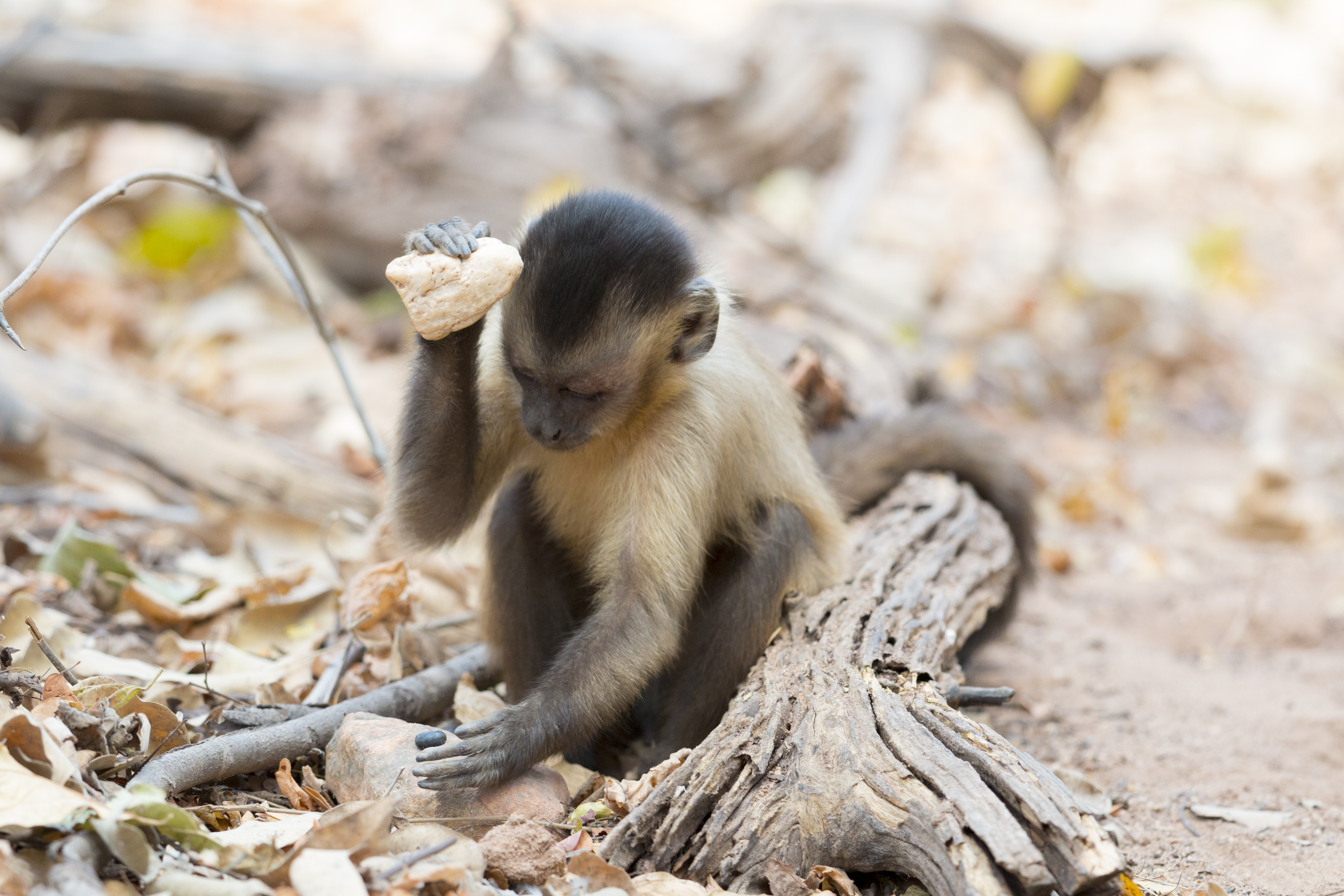
Capuchin monkey using rock as a tool to break nuts.

Extractive foraging is a strategy used by some primates, such as capuchin monkeys and chimpanzees. This behavior may involve the use of tools. Extractive foraging is not unique to primates, but it is suggested that these complex behaviors in primates may have contribute to the evolution of their intelligence.

Chimpanzees also use tools to dig up underground food. In experiments, they have selected and reused tools to excavate buried items. Tool-assisted foraging behaviors in chimpanzees like ant-dipping or termite-fishing can depend on the availability of resources and frequency of encounters, not just cognitive capacity.

== Morphological adaptations ==
The physical ability to process certain types of food can dictate dietary choices and foraging strategies. Mandible shape in primates is an important variable in understand what foods primates can eat. More generally, primate body size also influences foraging strategies. Small primates prioritize high-energy, easy-to-digest foods like insects, nectar, and ripe fruits. Larger primates can process more fibrous foods like mature leaves. In high-altitude Himalayan habitats, gray langurs alternate from preferred foods like young leaves and fruits to fibrous, less-profitable fallback foods like bark, mature leaves, roots during the winter.
