= John Goss-Custard =

British behavioural ecologist

John D. Goss-Custard is a British behavioural ecologist; he was one of the first scientists to carry out field work on foraging behaviour making use of optimising models, specifically the optimal diet model. After completing a BSc degree in Zoology at the University of Bristol, he moved to the University of Aberdeen to carry out research for a PhD degree, which he was awarded in 1966. The University of Aberdeen awarded him its DSc degree in 1987.

Goss-Custard's PhD was based on the study of foraging in the Common Redshank. Subsequently, he worked at the Centre for Ecology and Hydrology's Furzebrook Research Station at Wareham, Dorset, leading an extensive project on the foraging of overwintering Eurasian Oystercatchers on the estuary of the River Exe. This project led to one of the first uses of agent-based modelling to predict ecological relationships in an extended landscape; the model, developed for the Exe estuary, was subsequently tested successfully on the Wash. This work was surveyed in a book that he edited.

Goss-Custard retired from his post at CEH in 2002. Although he did not hold a substantive university post, Goss-Custard held an honorary position at the University of Exeter for many years, and is currently a visiting professor at the University of Bournemouth. He co-supervised PhD degrees with colleagues at the University of Exeter and also the University of Oxford.
