= Eric Charnov =

American evolutionary ecologist

Eric L. Charnov
- Born: October 29, 1947 (age 78)
- Education: University of Washington
- Scientific career
- Fields: Ecology
- Workplaces: University of New Mexico; University of Utah
- Thesis: Optimal Foraging: Some Theoretical Explorations (1973)
- Doctoral advisor: Gordon Orians
- Doctoral students: James J. Bull

Eric Lee Charnov (born October 29, 1947) is an American evolutionary ecologist. He is best known for his work on foraging, especially the marginal value theorem, and life history theory, especially sex allocation and scaling/allometric rules. He is a MacArthur Fellow and a Fellow of the American Academy of Arts and Sciences. Two of his papers are Science Citation Classics.

Charnov gained his B.S. in 1969 from the University of Michigan and his PhD in evolutionary ecology from the University of Washington in 1973. He is a Distinguished Professor (Emeritus) of Biology at the University of New Mexico and the University of Utah.

His research interests are: metabolic ecology (temperature and body size in the determination of biological times and rates) and evolutionary ecology: population genetics, evolutionary game theory, and optimization models to understand the evolution of life histories, sex allocation, sexual selection, and foraging decisions.

== Bibliography ==
- Charnov, E.L. 1993. Life History Invariants. Oxford University Press, 167 pp. ISBN 0-19-854071-X
- Charnov, E.L. 1982. The Theory of Sex Allocation. Princeton University Press, 355 pp. ISBN 0-691-08312-6
