= Marginal value theorem =

Mathematical model of animal foraging behavior

The marginal value theorem (MVT) is an optimality model that usually describes the behavior of an optimally foraging individual in a system where resources (often food) are located in discrete patches separated by areas with no resources. Due to the resource-free space, animals must spend time traveling between patches. The MVT can also be applied to other situations in which organisms face diminishing returns.

The MVT was first proposed by Eric Charnov in 1976. In his original formulation: "The predator should leave the patch it is presently in when the marginal capture rate in the patch drops to the average capture rate for the habitat."

== Definition ==
Most animals must forage for food in order to meet their energetic needs, but doing so is energetically costly. It is assumed that evolution by natural selection results in animals utilizing the most economic and efficient strategy to balance energy gain and consumption. The marginal value theorem is an optimality model that describes the strategy that maximizes gain per unit time in systems where resources, and thus rate of returns, decrease with time. The model weighs benefits and costs and is used to predict giving up time and giving up density. Giving up time (GUT) is the interval of time between when the animal last feeds and when it leaves the patch. Giving up density (GUD) is the food density within a patch when the animal will choose to move on to other food patches.

When an animal is foraging in a system where food sources are patchily distributed, the MVT can be used to predict how much time an individual will spend searching for a particular patch before moving on to a new one. In general, individuals will stay longer if (1) patches are farther apart or (2) current patches are poor in resources. Both situations increase the ratio of travel cost to foraging benefit.

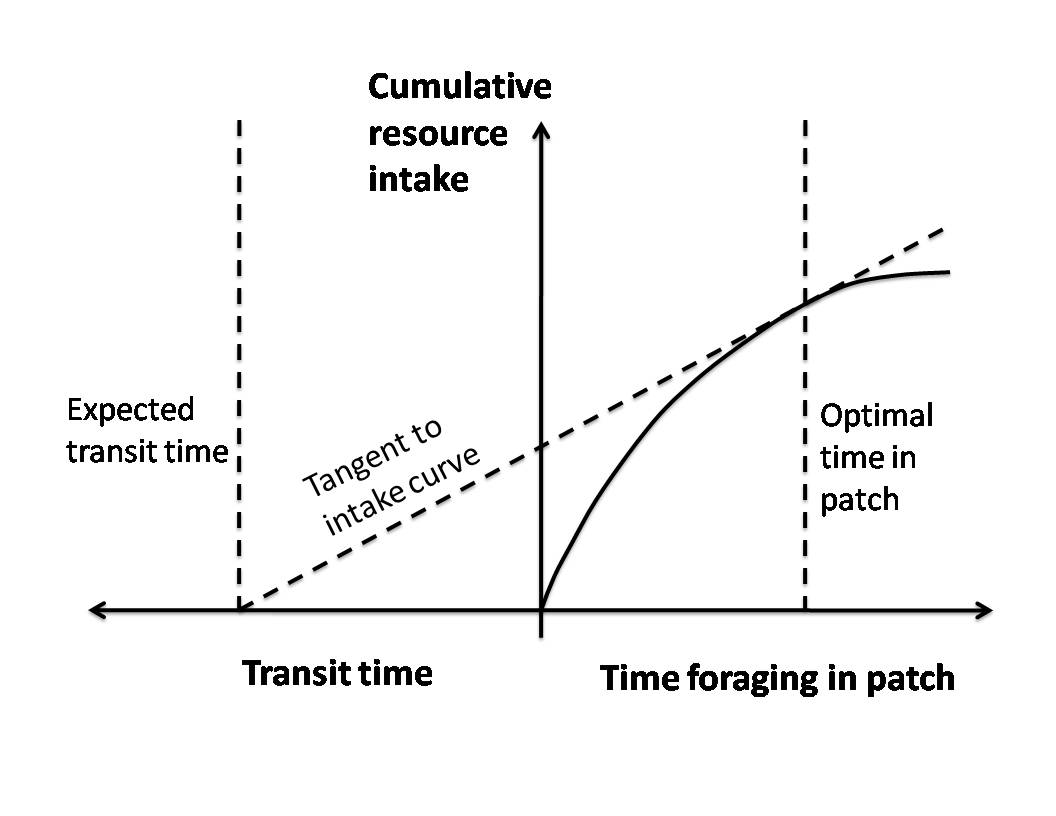
The optimal time spent in a patch is given by the tangent to the resource intake curve that departs from the expected transit time value. Any other line crossing the resource intake curve has a shallower slope and thus a sub-optimal resource intake rate.

== Modeling ==
As animals forage in patchy systems, they balance resource intake, traveling time, and foraging time. Resource intake within a patch diminishes with time, as shown by the solid curve in the graph to the right. The curve follows this pattern because resource intake is initially very fast, but slows as the resource is depleted. Traveling time is shown by the distance from the leftmost vertical dotted line to the y-axis. Optimal foraging time is modeled by connecting this point on the x-axis tangentially to the resource intake curve. Doing so maximizes the ratio between resource intake and time spent foraging and traveling.

At the extremes of the loading curve, animals spend too much time traveling for a small payoff, or they search too long in a given patch for an ineffective load. The MVT identifies the best possible intermediate between these extremes.

=== Assumptions ===
1. The individual is assumed to control when it leaves the patch in order to maximize the ratio between resource intake and time.
2. The consumer depletes the amount of resources in the patch where they are foraging; therefore, the rate of intake of food in that patch decreases as a function of time.
3. If there is variation in the quality of patches, the MVT assumes that different patches are distributed randomly throughout the landscape.

== Examples ==
=== Humans ===
A common illustration of the MVT is apple picking in humans. When one first arrives at a new apple tree, the number of apples picked per minute is high, but it rapidly decreases as the lowest-hanging fruits are depleted. Strategies in which too few apples are picked from each tree or where each tree is exhausted are suboptimal because they result, respectively, in time lost travelling among trees or picking the hard to find last few apples from a tree. The optimal time spent picking apples in each tree is thus a compromise between these two strategies, which can be quantitatively found using the MVT.

=== Optimal foraging in great tits ===
Great tits are a species of bird found throughout Europe, northern Africa, and Asia. They are known to forage in “patchy” environments, and research has shown that their behavior can be modeled by optimal foraging models, including the MVT. In a 1977 study by R.A. Cowie, birds were deprived of food and then allowed to forage through patches in two different environments (the environments differed only in distance between patches). As predicted, in both cases birds spent more time in one area when the patches were farther away or yielded more benefits, regardless of the environment. In a similar experiment by Naef-Daenzer (1999), great tits were shown to have a foraging efficiency 30% better than random foraging would yield. This is because great tits were specifically spending more time in resource-rich areas, as predicted by the MVT. This data supports the use of the MVT in predicting the foraging behavior of great tits.

=== Feeding in hairy armadillos and guinea pigs ===
Experimental evidence has shown that screaming hairy armadillos and guinea pigs qualitatively follow MVT when foraging. The researchers ran several parallel experiments: one for each animal under consistent patch quality, and one for guinea pigs with varying patch quality. While the qualitative foraging trend was shown to follow MVT in each case, the quantitative analysis indicated that each patch was exploited further than expected.

=== Plant root growth ===
The MVT can be used to model foraging in plants as well as animals. Plants have been shown to preferentially place their roots, which are their foraging organs, in areas of higher resource concentration. Recall that the MVT predicts that animals will forage for longer in patches with higher resource quality. Plants increase root biomass in layers/areas of soil that are rich in nutrients and resources, and decrease root growth into areas of poor-quality soil. Thus, plants grow roots into patches of soil according to their wealth of resources in a manner consistent with the MVT. Additionally, plant roots grow more quickly through low-quality patches of soil than through high-quality patches of soil, just as foraging animals are predicted to spend less time in low-quality areas than high-quality areas.

=== Copulation time in dung flies ===
The MVT can be applied to situations other than foraging in which animals experience diminished returns. Consider, for example, the mating copulation duration of the yellow dung fly. In the dung fly mating system, males gather on fresh cow droppings and wait for females to arrive in smaller groups to lay their eggs. Males must compete with each other for the chance to mate with arriving females—sometimes one male will kick another male off of a female and take over mating with the female mid-copulation. In this instance, the second male fertilizes about 80% of the eggs. Thus, after a male has mated with a female he guards her so that no other males will have the opportunity to mate with her and displace his sperm before she lays her eggs. After the female lays her eggs, the male must take the time to search for another female before he is able to copulate again.

The question, then, is how long the dung fly should spend copulating with each female. On one hand, the longer a male dung fly copulates the more eggs he can fertilize. However, the benefits of extra copulation time diminish quickly, as the male loses the chance to find another female during long copulations. The MVT predicts that the optimal copulation time is just long enough to fertilize about 80% of the eggs; after this time, the rewards are much smaller and are not worth missing out on another mate. This predicted value for copulation time, 40 minutes, is very close to the average observed value, 36 minutes.

In dung flies, the observed values of copulation time and time searching for another mate vary with body weight. Heavier males have shorter search times and shorter copulation times. These shorter search times are likely due to increased cost of travel with increased body weight; shorter copulation times probably reflect that it is easier for heavier males to successfully take over females mid-copulation. Additionally, researchers have taken into account “patch quality,” i.e. the quality of females arriving on the various cowpats. Research also shows that males copulate for longer with the larger females who hold more eggs and have larger reproductive tract dimensions. Thus, males change their copulation time to maximize their fitness, but they are doing so in response to selection imposed by female morphology. Even with these variations, male dung flies do exhibit close-to-optimal copulation time relative to their body size, as predicted by the MVT.

== Criticism ==
Many studies, such as the examples presented above, have shown good qualitative support for predictions generated by the marginal value theorem. However, in some more quantitative studies, the predictions of the MVT haven't been as successful, with the observed values substantially deviating from predictions. One proposed explanation for these deviations is that it is difficult to objectively measure payoff rates. For example, an animal in an unpredictable environment may need to spend extra time sampling, making it hard for researchers to determine foraging time.

Beyond this imprecision, some researchers propose that there is something fundamental missing from the model. Namely, animals are probably doing more than just foraging, whether it be dealing with predation risks or searching for mating opportunities. Natural selection is not the only force influencing the evolution of species. Sexual selection, for example, may alter foraging behaviors, making them less consistent with the MVT. These researchers point out that the marginal value theorem is a starting point, but complexity and nuances must be incorporated into models and tests for foraging and patch-use.

One other type of model that has been used in place of MVT in predicting foraging behavior is the state-dependent behavior model. Although state-dependent models have been viewed as a generalization of the MVT, they are unlikely to generate broadly applicable predictions like those from the MVT because they test predictions under a specific set of conditions. While the predictions of these models must be tested under precise conditions, they might offer valuable insights not available from broader models such as MVT.

== See also ==
- Diminishing returns
- Optimal foraging theory
