= Optimal foraging theory =

Behavioral ecology model

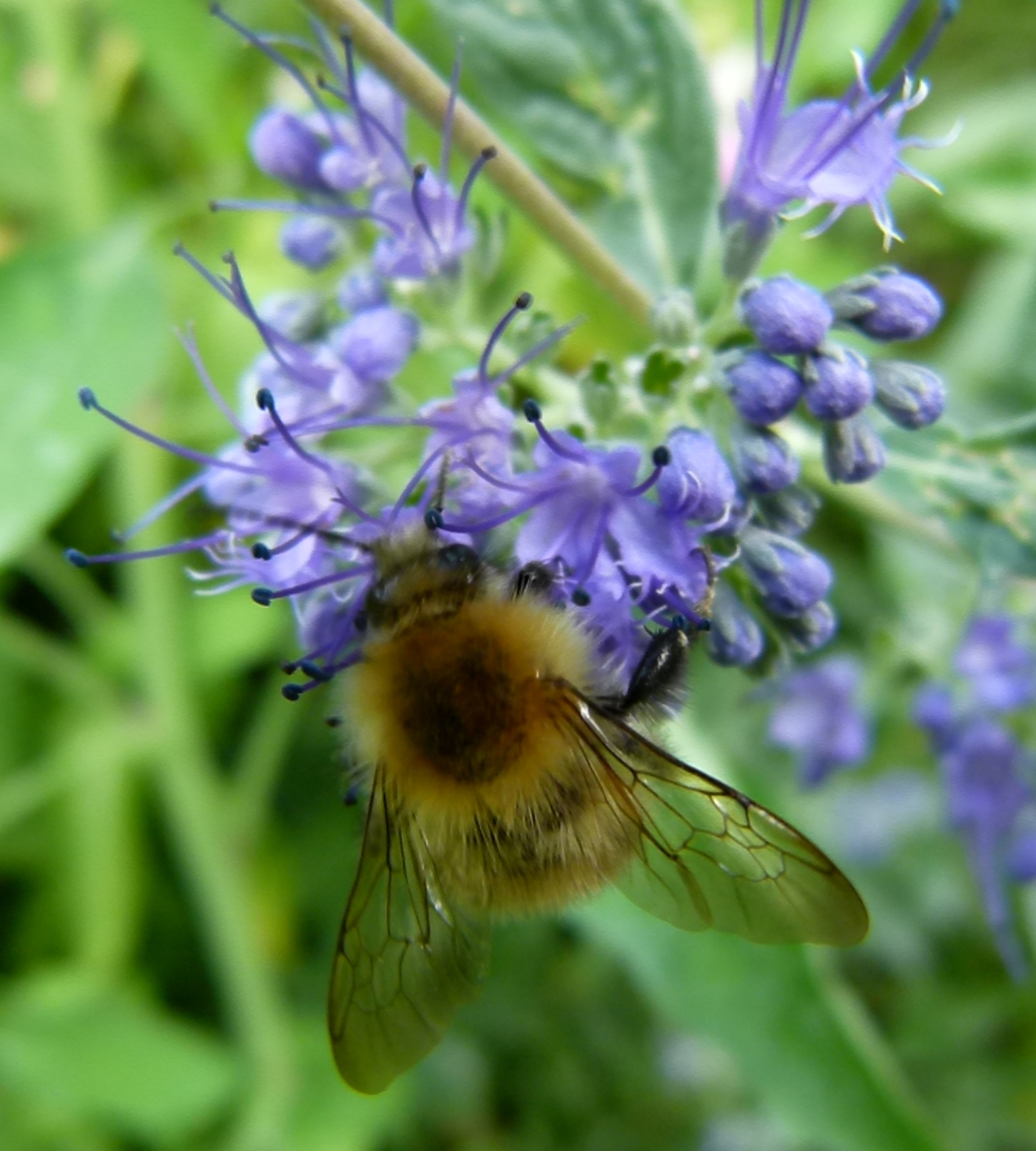
Worker bees forage nectar not only for themselves, but for their whole hive community. Optimal foraging theory predicts that this bee will forage in a way that will maximize its hive's net yield of energy.

Optimal foraging theory (OFT) is a behavioral ecology model that helps predict how an animal behaves when searching for food. Although obtaining food provides the animal with energy, searching for and capturing the food require both energy and time. To maximize fitness, an animal adopts a foraging strategy that provides the most benefit (energy) for the lowest cost, maximizing the net energy gained. OFT helps predict the best strategy that an animal can use to achieve this goal.

OFT is an ecological application of the optimality model. This theory assumes that the most economically advantageous foraging pattern will be selected for in a species through natural selection. When using OFT to model foraging behavior, organisms are said to be maximizing a variable known as the currency, such as the most food per unit time. In addition, the constraints of the environment are other variables that must be considered. Constraints are defined as factors that can limit the forager's ability to maximize the currency. The optimal decision rule, or the organism's best foraging strategy, is defined as the decision that maximizes the currency under the constraints of the environment. Identifying the optimal decision rule is the primary goal of the OFT. The connection between OFT and biological evolution has garnered interest over the past decades. Studies on optimal foraging behaviors at the population level have utilized evolutionary birth-death dynamics models. While these models confirm the existence of objective functions, such as "currency" in certain scenarios, they also prompt questions regarding their applicability in other limits such as high population interactions.

== Building an optimal foraging model ==
An optimal foraging model generates quantitative predictions of how animals maximize their fitness while they forage. The model building process involves identifying the currency, constraints, and appropriate decision rule for the forager.

Currency is defined as the unit that is optimized by the animal. It is also a hypothesis of the costs and benefits that are imposed on that animal. For example, a certain forager gains energy from food, but incurs the cost of searching for the food: the time and energy spent searching could have been used instead on other endeavors, such as finding mates or protecting young. It would be in the animal's best interest to maximize its benefits at the lowest cost. Thus, the currency in this situation could be defined as net energy gain per unit time. However, for a different forager, the time it takes to digest the food after eating could be a more significant cost than the time and energy spent looking for food. In this case, the currency could be defined as net energy gain per digestive turnover time instead of net energy gain per unit time. Furthermore, benefits and costs can depend on a forager's community. For example, a forager living in a hive would most likely forage in a manner that would maximize efficiency for its colony rather than itself. By identifying the currency, one can construct a hypothesis about which benefits and costs are important to the forager in question.

Constraints are hypotheses about the limitations that are placed on an animal. These limitations can be due to features of the environment or the physiology of the animal and could limit their foraging efficiency. The time that it takes for the forager to travel from the nesting site to the foraging site is an example of a constraint. The maximum number of food items a forager is able to carry back to its nesting site is another example of a constraint. There could also be cognitive constraints on animals, such as limits to learning and memory. The more constraints that one is able to identify in a given system, the more predictive power the model will have.

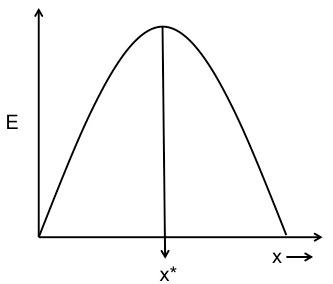
Figure 1. Energy gain per cost (E) for adopting foraging strategy x. Adapted from Parker & Smith.

Given the hypotheses about the currency and the constraints, the optimal decision rule is the model's prediction of what the animal's best foraging strategy should be. Possible examples of optimal decision rules could be the optimal number of food items that an animal should carry back to its nesting site or the optimal size of a food item that an animal should feed on. Figure 1, shows an example of how an optimal decision rule could be determined from a graphical model. The curve represents the energy gain per cost (E) for adopting foraging strategy x. Energy gain per cost is the currency being optimized. The constraints of the system determine the shape of this curve. The optimal decision rule (x*) is the strategy for which the currency, energy gain per costs, is the greatest. Optimal foraging models can look very different and become very complex, depending on the nature of the currency and the number of constraints considered. However, the general principles of currency, constraints, and optimal decision rule remain the same for all models.

To test a model, one can compare the predicted strategy to the animal's actual foraging behavior. If the model fits the observed data well, then the hypotheses about the currency and constraints are supported. If the model does not fit the data well, then it is possible that either the currency or a particular constraint has been incorrectly identified.

== Different feeding systems and classes of predators ==
Optimal foraging theory is widely applicable to feeding systems throughout the animal kingdom. Under the OFT, any organism of interest can be viewed as a predator that forages prey. There are different classes of predators that organisms fall into and each class has distinct foraging and predation strategies.

- True predators attack large numbers of prey throughout their life. They kill their prey either immediately or shortly after the attack. They may eat all or only part of their prey. True predators include tigers, lions, whales, sharks and ants.
- Grazers eat only a portion of their prey. They harm the prey, but rarely kill it. Grazers include antelope, cattle, and mosquitoes.
- Parasites, like grazers, eat only a part of their prey (host), but rarely the entire organism. They spend all or large portions of their life cycle living in/on a single host. This intimate relationship is typical of tapeworms, liver flukes, plant parasites, such as the potato blight.
- Parasitoids are mainly typical of wasps (order Hymenoptera), and some flies (order Diptera). Eggs are laid inside the larvae of other arthropods which hatch and consume the host from the inside, killing it. This unusual predator–host relationship is typical of about 10% of all insects. Many viruses that attack single-celled organisms (such as bacteriophages) are also parasitoids; they reproduce inside a single host that is inevitably killed by the association.

The optimization of these different foraging and predation strategies can be explained by the optimal foraging theory. In each case, there are costs, benefits, and limitations that ultimately determine the optimal decision rule that the predator should follow.

== Optimal diet model ==
One classical version of the optimal foraging theory is the optimal diet model, which is also known as the prey choice model or the contingency model. In this model, the predator encounters different prey items and decides whether to eat what it has or search for a more profitable prey item. The model predicts that foragers should ignore low profitability prey items when more profitable items are present and abundant.

The profitability of a prey item is dependent on several ecological variables. E is the amount of energy (calories) that a prey item provides the predator. Handling time (h) is the amount of time it takes the predator to handle the food, beginning from the time the predator finds the prey item to the time the prey item is eaten. The profitability of a prey item is then defined as E/h. Additionally, search time (S) is the amount of time it takes the predator to find a prey item and is dependent on the abundance of the food and the ease of locating it. In this model, the currency is energy intake per unit time and the constraints include the actual values of E, h, and S, as well as the fact that prey items are encountered sequentially.

=== Model of choice between big and small prey ===
Using these variables, the optimal diet model can predict how predators choose between two prey types: big prey_{1} with energy value E_{1} and handling time h_{1}, and small prey_{2} with energy value E_{2} and handling time h_{2}. In order to maximize its overall rate of energy gain, a predator must consider the profitability of the two prey types. If it is assumed that big prey_{1} is more profitable than small prey_{2}, then E_{1}/h_{1} > E_{2}/h_{2}. Thus, if the predator encounters prey_{1}, it should always choose to eat it, because of its higher profitability. It should never bother to go searching for prey_{2}. However, if the animal encounters prey_{2}, it should reject it to look for a more profitable prey_{1}, unless the time it would take to find prey_{1} is too long and costly for it to be worth it. Thus, the animal should eat prey_{2} only if E_{2}/h_{2} > E_{1}/(h_{1}+S_{1}), where S_{1} is the search time for prey_{1}. Since it is always favorable to choose to eat prey_{1}, the choice to eat prey_{1} is not dependent on the abundance of prey_{2}. But since the length of S_{1} (i.e. how difficult it is to find prey1) is logically dependent on the density of prey_{1}, the choice to eat prey_{2} is dependent on the abundance of prey_{1}.

=== Generalist and specialist diets ===
The optimal diet model also predicts that different types of animals should adopt different diets based on variations in search time. This idea is an extension of the model of prey choice that was discussed above. The equation, E_{2}/h_{2} > E_{1}/(h_{1}+S_{1}), can be rearranged to give: S_{1} > [(E_{1}h_{2})/E_{2}] – h_{1}. This rearranged form gives the threshold for how long S_{1} must be for an animal to choose to eat both prey_{1} and prey_{2}. Animals that have S_{1}s that reach the threshold are defined as generalists. In nature, generalists include a wide range of prey items in their diet. An example of a generalist is a mouse, which consumes a large variety of seeds, grains, and nuts. In contrast, predators with relatively short S_{1}s are still better off choosing to eat only prey_{1}. These types of animals are defined as specialists and have very exclusive diets in nature. An example of a specialist is the koala, which solely consumes eucalyptus leaves. In general, different animals across the four functional classes of predators exhibit strategies ranging across a continuum between being a generalist and a specialist. Additionally, since the choice to eat prey2 is dependent on the abundance of prey1 (as discussed earlier), if prey1 becomes so scarce that S1 reaches the threshold, then the animal should switch from exclusively eating prey1 to eating both prey1 and prey2. In other words, if the food within a specialist's diet becomes very scarce, a specialist can sometimes switch to being a generalist.

=== Functional response curves ===
As previously mentioned, the amount of time it takes to search for a prey item depends on the density of the prey. Functional response curves show the rate of prey capture as a function of food density and can be used in conjunction with the optimal diet theory to predict foraging behavior of predators. There are three different types of functional response curves.

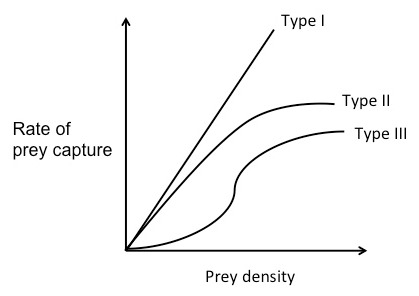
Figure 2. Three types of functional response curves. Adapted from Staddon.

For a Type I functional response curve, the rate of prey capture increases linearly with food density. At low prey densities, the search time is long. Since the predator spends most of its time searching, it eats every prey item it finds. As prey density increases, the predator is able to capture the prey faster and faster. At a certain point, the rate of prey capture is so high, that the predator doesn't have to eat every prey item it encounters. After this point, the predator should choose only the prey items with the highest E/h.

For a Type II functional response curve, the rate of prey capture negatively accelerates as it increases with food density. This is because it assumes that the predator is limited by its capacity to process food. In other words, as the food density increases, handling time increases. At the beginning of the curve, rate of prey capture increases nearly linearly with prey density and there is almost no handling time. As prey density increases, the predator spends less and less time searching for prey and more and more time handling the prey. The rate of prey capture increases less and less, until it finally plateaus. The high number of prey basically "swamps" the predator.

A Type III functional response curve is a sigmoid curve. The rate of prey capture increases at first with prey density at a positively accelerated rate, but then at high densities changes to the negatively accelerated form, similar to that of the Type II curve. At high prey densities (the top of the curve), each new prey item is caught almost immediately. The predator is able to be choosy and does not eat every item it finds. So, assuming that there are two prey types with different profitabilities that are both at high abundance, the predator will choose the item with the higher E/h. However, at low prey densities (the bottom of the curve) the rate of prey capture increases faster than linearly. This means that as the predator feeds and the prey type with the higher E/h becomes less abundant, the predator will start to switch its preference to the prey type with the lower E/h, because that type will be relatively more abundant. This phenomenon is known as prey switching.

=== Predator–prey interaction ===
Predator–prey coevolution often makes it unfavorable for a predator to consume certain prey items, since many anti-predator defenses increase handling time. Examples include porcupine quills, the palatability and digestibility of the poison dart frog, crypsis, and other predator avoidance behaviors. In addition, because toxins may be present in many prey types, predators include a lot of variability in their diets to prevent any one toxin from reaching dangerous levels. Thus, it is possible that an approach focusing only on energy intake may not fully explain an animal's foraging behavior in these situations.

== Marginal value theorem and optimal foraging ==
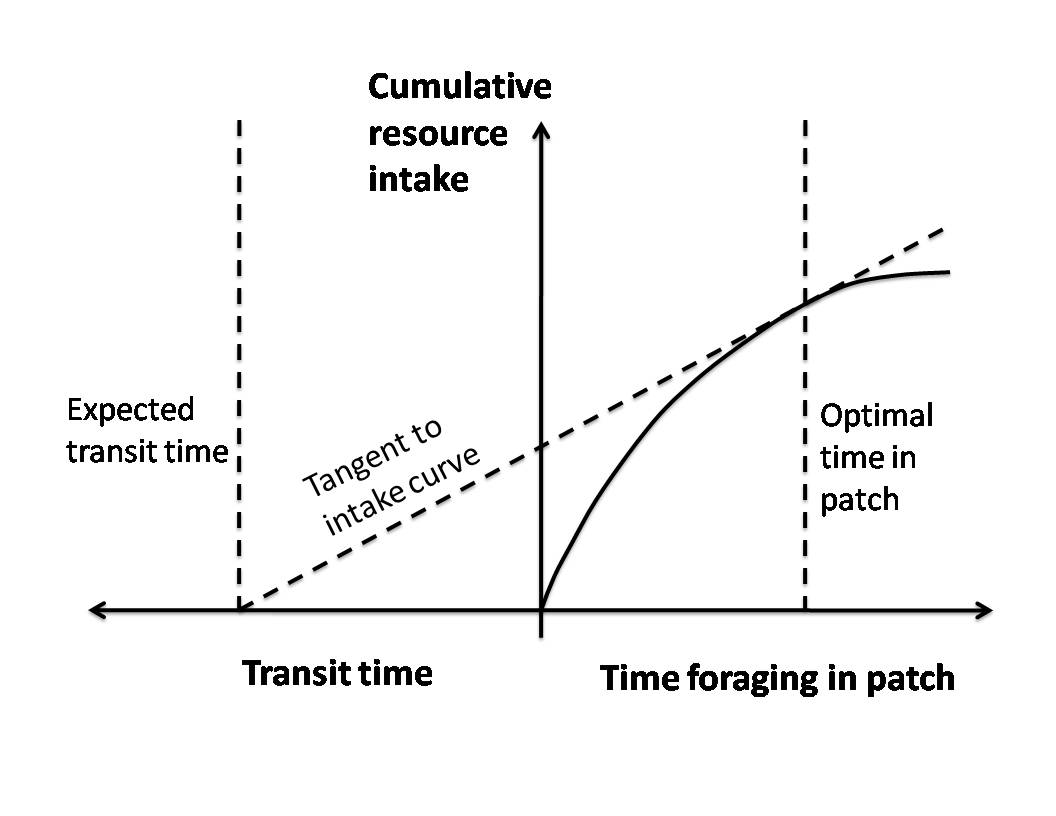
Figure 3. Marginal value theorem shown graphically.

The marginal value theorem is a type of optimality model that is often applied to optimal foraging. This theorem is used to describe a situation in which an organism searching for food in a patch must decide when it is economically favorable to leave. While the animal is within a patch, it experiences the law of diminishing returns, where it becomes harder and harder to find prey as time goes on. This may be because the prey is being depleted, the prey begins to take evasive action and becomes harder to catch, or the predator starts crossing its own path more as it searches. This law of diminishing returns can be shown as a curve of energy gain per time spent in a patch (Figure 3). The curve starts off with a steep slope and gradually levels off as prey becomes harder to find. Another important cost to consider is the traveling time between different patches and the nesting site. An animal loses foraging time while it travels and expends energy through its locomotion.

In this model, the currency being optimized is usually net energy gain per unit time. The constraints are the travel time and the shape of the curve of diminishing returns. Graphically, the currency (net energy gain per unit time) is given by the slope of a diagonal line that starts at the beginning of traveling time and intersects the curve of diminishing returns (Figure 3). In order to maximize the currency, one wants the line with the greatest slope that still touches the curve (the tangent line). The place that this line touches the curve provides the optimal decision rule of the amount of time that the animal should spend in a patch before leaving.

== Examples of optimal foraging models in animals ==
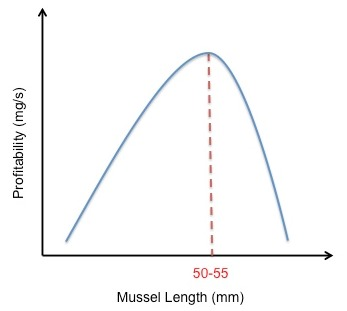
Figure 4. Right-shifted mussel profitability curve. Adapted from Meire & Ervynck.

=== Optimal foraging of oystercatchers ===
Oystercatcher mussel feeding provides an example of how the optimal diet model can be utilized. Oystercatchers forage on mussels and crack them open with their bills. The constraints on these birds are the characteristics of the different mussel sizes. While large mussels provide more energy than small mussels, large mussels are harder to crack open due to their thicker shells. This means that while large mussels have a higher energy content (E), they also have a longer handling time (h). The profitability of any mussel is calculated as E/h. The oystercatchers must decide which mussel size will provide enough nutrition to outweigh the cost and energy required to open it. In their study, Meire and Ervynck tried to model this decision by graphing the relative profitabilities of different sized mussels. They came up with a bell-shaped curve, indicating that moderately sized mussels were the most profitable. However, they observed that if an oystercatcher rejected too many small mussels, the time it took to search for the next suitable mussel greatly increased. This observation shifted their bell-curve to the right (Figure 4). However, while this model predicted that oystercatchers should prefer mussels of 50–55 mm, the observed data showed that oystercatchers actually prefer mussels of 30–45 mm. Meire and Ervynk then realized the preference of mussel size did not depend only on the profitability of the prey, but also on the prey density. After this was accounted for, they found a good agreement between the model's prediction and the observed data.

=== Optimal foraging in starlings ===
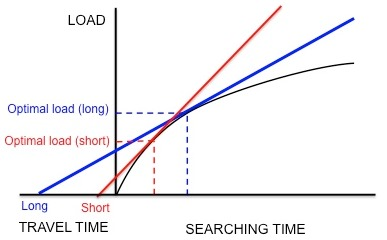
Figure 5. If starlings are maximizing net rate of energy gain, longer traveling time results in larger optimum load. Adapted from Krebs and Davies.

The foraging behavior of the European starling, Sturnus vulgaris, provides an example of how marginal value theorem is used to model optimal foraging. Starlings leave their nests and travel to food patches in search for larval leatherjackets to bring back to their young. The starlings must determine the optimal number of prey items to take back in one trip (i.e. the optimal load size). While the starlings forage within a patch, they experience diminishing returns: the starling is able to hold only so many leatherjackets in its bill, so the speed with which the parent picks up larvae decreases with the number of larvae that it already has in its bill. Thus, the constraints are the shape of the curve of diminishing returns and the travel time (the time it takes to make a round trip from the nest to a patch and back). In addition, the currency is hypothesized to be net energy gain per unit time. Using this currency and the constraints, the optimal load can be predicted by drawing a line tangent to the curve of diminishing returns, as discussed previously (Figure 3).

Kacelnik et al. wanted to determine if this species does indeed optimize net energy gain per unit time as hypothesized. They designed an experiment in which the starlings were trained to collect mealworms from an artificial feeder at different distances from the nest. The researchers artificially generated a fixed curve of diminishing returns for the birds by dropping mealworms at successively longer and longer intervals. The birds continued to collect mealworms as they were presented, until they reached an "optimal" load and flew home. As Figure 5 shows, if the starlings were maximizing net energy gain per unit time, a short travel time would predict a small optimal load and a long travel time would predict a larger optimal load. In agreement with these predictions, Kacelnik found that the longer the distance between the nest and the artificial feeder, the larger the load size. In addition, the observed load sizes quantitatively corresponded very closely to the model's predictions. Other models based on different currencies, such as energy gained per energy spent (i.e. energy efficiency), failed to predict the observed load sizes as accurately. Thus, Kacelnik concluded that starlings maximize net energy gain per unit time. This conclusion was not disproved in later experiments.

=== Optimal foraging in bees ===
Worker bees provide another example of the use of marginal value theorem in modeling optimal foraging behavior. Bees forage from flower to flower collecting nectar to carry back to the hive. While this situation is similar to that of the starlings, both the constraints and currency are actually different for the bees.

A bee does not experience diminishing returns because of nectar depletion or any other characteristic of the flowers themselves. The total amount of nectar foraged increases linearly with time spent in a patch. However, the weight of the nectar adds a significant cost to the bee's flight between flowers and its trip back to the hive. Wolf and Schmid-Hempel showed, by experimentally placing varying weights on the backs of bees, that the cost of heavy nectar is so great that it shortens the bees' lifespan. The shorter the lifespan of a worker bee, the less overall time it has to contribute to its colony. Thus, there is a curve of diminishing returns for the net yield of energy that the hive receives as the bee gathers more nectar during one trip.

The cost of heavy nectar also impacts the currency used by the bees. Unlike the starlings in the previous example, bees maximize energy efficiency (energy gained per energy spent) rather than net rate of energy gain (net energy gained per time). This is because the optimal load predicted by maximizing net rate of energy gain is too heavy for the bees and shortens their lifespan, decreasing their overall productivity for the hive, as explained earlier. By maximizing energy efficiency, the bees are able to avoid expending too much energy per trip and are able to live long enough to maximize their lifetime productivity for their hive. In a different paper, Schmid-Hempel showed that the observed relationship between load size and flight time is well correlated with the predictions based on maximizing energy efficiency, but very poorly correlated with the predictions based on maximizing net rate of energy gain.

=== Optimal foraging in centrarchid fishes ===
The nature of prey selection by two centrarchids (white crappie and bluegill) has been presented as a model incorporating optimal foraging strategies by Manatunge and Asaeda. The visual field of the foraging fish as represented by the reactive distance was analysed in detail to estimate the number of prey encounters per search bout. The predicted reactive distances were compared with experimental data. The energetic cost associated with fish foraging behaviour was calculated based on the sequence of events that takes place for each prey consumed. Comparisons of the relative abundance of prey species and size categories in the stomach to the lake environment indicated that both white crappie and bluegill (length < 100 mm) strongly select prey utilizing an energy optimization strategy. In most cases, the fish exclusively selected large Daphnia, ignoring evasive prey types (Cyclops, diaptomids) and small cladocera. This selectivity is the result of fish actively avoiding prey with high evasion capabilities even though they appear to be high in energetic content and having translated this into optimal selectivity through capture success rates. The energy consideration and visual system, apart from the forager's ability to capture prey, are the major determinants of prey selectivity for large-sized bluegill and white crappie still at planktivorous stages.

== Criticism and limitations ==
Although many studies, such as the ones cited in the examples above, provide quantitative support for optimal foraging theory and demonstrate its usefulness, the model has received criticism regarding its validity and limitations.

First, optimal foraging theory relies on the assumption that natural selection will optimize foraging strategies of organisms. However, natural selection is not an all-powerful force that produces perfect designs, but rather a passive process of selection for genetically based traits that increase organisms' reproductive success. Given that genetics involves interactions between loci, recombination, and other complexities, there is no guarantee that natural selection can optimize a specific behavioral parameter.

In addition, OFT also assumes that foraging behaviors are able to be freely shaped by natural selection, because these behaviors are independent from other activities of the organism. However, given that organisms are integrated systems, rather than mechanical aggregates of parts, this is not always the case. For example, the need to avoid predators may constrain foragers to feed less than the optimal rate. Thus, an organism's foraging behaviors may not be optimized as OFT would predict, because they are not independent from other behaviors.

Another limitation of OFT is that it lacks precision in practice. In theory, an optimal foraging model gives researchers specific, quantitative predictions about a predator's optimal decision rule based on the hypotheses about the currency and constraints of the system. However, in reality, it is difficult to define basic concepts like prey type, encounter rates, or even a patch as the forager perceives them. Thus, while the variables of OFT can seem consistent theoretically, in practice, they can be arbitrary and difficult to measure.

Furthermore, although the premise of OFT is to maximize an organism's fitness, many studies show only correlations between observed and predicted foraging behavior and stop short of testing whether the animal's behavior actually increases its reproductive fitness. It is possible that in certain cases, there is no correlation between foraging returns and reproductive success at all. Without accounting for this possibility, many studies using the OFT remain incomplete and fail to address and test the main point of the theory.

One of the most imperative critiques of OFT is that it may not be truly testable. This issue arises whenever there is a discrepancy between the model's predictions and the actual observations. It is difficult to tell whether the model is fundamentally wrong or whether a specific variable has been inaccurately identified or left out. Because it is possible to add endless plausible modifications to the model, the model of optimality may never be rejected. This creates the problem of researchers shaping their model to fit their observations, rather than rigorously testing their hypotheses about the animal's foraging behavior.

== Relevance to human evolution and anthropology ==
OFT is a centrally important model in the study of human behavioral ecology, in particular to the evolution of human subsistence methods and cultural evolution during the Paleolithic. As food provides energy but costs energy to obtain, foraging behaviors (including alleles contributing to these behaviors) will be selected for net optimality over evolutionary time.

The currency of optimal foraging theory is energy because it is an essential component for organisms, but it is also the downfall of optimal foraging theory in regard to archaeology. Optimal foraging theory assumes that behaviour is to some extent influenced by genetic makeup. However, this can be hard to accepted in relation to complex animals with a high behavioral flexibility. Human behaviour is not always predictable when using the premise of optimal foraging theory – hunter-gatherers could for ritual or feasting purposes choose a game which would not benefit energy, but would benefit other needs. The goals and currencies of humans can often change due to behavioral flexibility. These changes can occur over a long time, over a season or during a hunt. Optimal foraging theory must therefore be more complex and introduces more goals and constraints to match the complex decision-making processes employed by humans. The decision-making processes can furthermore be influenced by long-term and short-term experiences and these experiences can then further influence others.

But optimal foraging theory has helped archaeology in generating new interpretations of patterns in the archaeological record and thinking about human behaviours in greater detail. Optimal foraging theory has also given archaeology a better insight into the cost and benefits of different resources.
