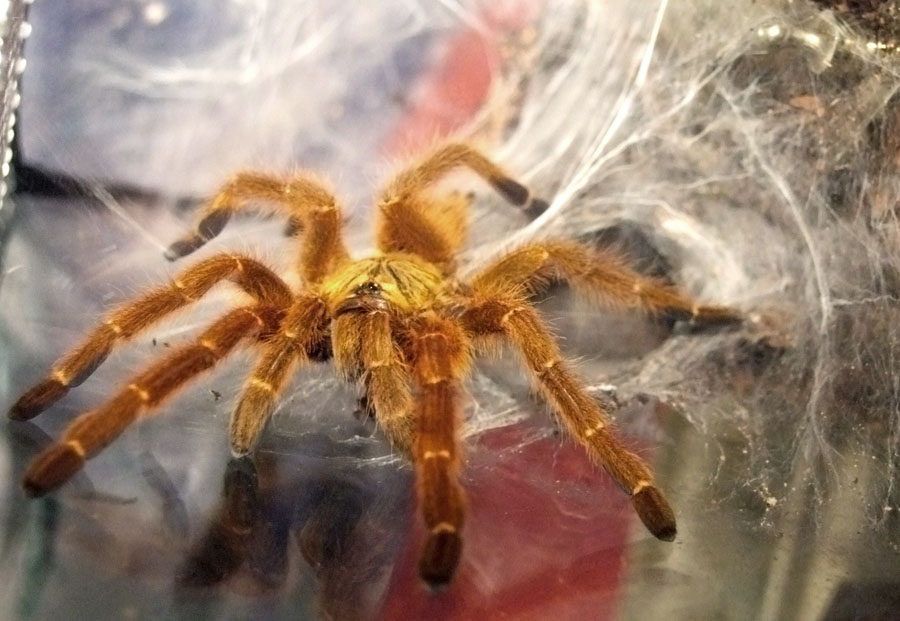
- A Pterinochilus murinus tarantula

Scientific classification
- Kingdom: Animalia
- Phylum: Arthropoda
- Subphylum: Chelicerata
- Class: Arachnida
- Order: Araneae
- Infraorder: Mygalomorphae
- Family: Theraphosidae
- Subfamily: Harpactirinae; Pocock, 1897

Genera
- See text

= Harpactirinae =

Subfamily of African tarantula spiders

The Harpactirinae (commonly called baboon spiders) are a subfamily of tarantulas which are native to the continent of Africa. Like many Old World tarantulas, they have a relatively strong venom and can inflict a painful bite.

== Description ==
Harpactirinae are ground-dwelling spiders which build silk-lined burrows, often under debris such as stones, using their fangs and chelicerae for digging. Habitats include savanna woodlands, grasslands and dry scrublands.

== Systematics ==
The following genera and species are present in the Harpactirinae. In addition, the genus Brachionopus (Pocock, 1897) has been suggested for placement in this subfamily, but its taxonomy is currently disputed.

Augacephalus (Gallon, 2002)
Type species: Augacephalus breyeri

In synonymy:
Augacephalus nigrifemur (Schmidt, 1995) = Augacephalus junodi

- Augacephalus breyeri (Hewitt, 1919) — Mozambique, South Africa, Eswatini
- Augacephalus ezendami (Gallon, 2001) — Mozambique, the Mozambique Gold[en] Baboon, Mozambique Half Moon Baboon
- Augacephalus junodi (Simon, 1904) — East, South Africa, the [East African] Bushveld Golden Brown Featherleg Baboon

Bacillochilus (Gallon, 2010) [monotypic]

- Bacillochilus xenostridulans (Gallon, 2010) — Angola

Brachionopus (Pocock, 1897)
To quote Platnick's World Spider Catalog v. 12.5, "N.B.: transferred here from the Barychelidae by Raven, 1985a: 112; Brachyonopus is an unjustified emendation; Raven's transfer was not accepted by Charpentier, 1993: 5 or Schmidt, 2002a: 12 and 2008: 3, who nevertheless identified no close relatives of the genus among the known barychelids; Gallon, 2002: 204 argued for its inclusion in the Barychelidae but indicated that it "does not fit in any current barychelid subfamily" but later (Gallon, 2010b: 79) considered it a harpactirine.".

In other words, its taxonomy is in dispute and the many recent workers do not consider it a theraphosid. All are found in South Africa.

- Brachionopus annulatus (Purcell, 1903)
- Brachionopus leptopelmiformis (Strand, 1907)
- Brachionopus pretoriae (Purcell, 1904)
- Brachionopus robustus (Pocock, 1897)
- Brachionopus tristis (Purcell, 1903)

Ceratogyrus (Pocock, 1897) [Senior synonym of Coelogenium Purcell, 1902]
Type species: Ceratogyrus darlingi

Transferred to other genera:
Ceratogyrus ezendami → Augacephalus ezendami
Ceratogyrus nigrifemur → Augacephalus nigrifemur
Ceratogyrus raveni (Smith, 1990) → Pterinochilus chordatus

In synonymy:
Ceratogyrus bechuanicus (Purcell, 1902) and Ceratogyrus schultzei (Purcell, 1908) = Ceratogyrus darlingi
Ceratogyrus cornuatus (De Wet & Dippenaar-Schoeman, 1991) = Ceratogyrus marshalli

- Ceratogyrus brachycephalus (Hewitt, 1919) — Botswana, Zimbabwe, South Africa, the [Botswanan] Greater Horned Baboon
- Ceratogyrus darlingi (Pocock, 1897) — Zimbabwe, Mozambique, the [Zimbabwean, African] Rear Horned Baboon, Curved Horn Baboon
- Ceratogyrus dolichocephalus (Hewitt, 1919) — Zimbabwe
- Ceratogyrus hillyardi (Smith, 1990) — Malawi
- Ceratogyrus marshalli (Pocock, 1897) — Zimbabwe, Mozambique, the [Zimbabwean] Straight Horned Baboon
- Ceratogyrus meridionalis (Hirst, 1907) — Malawi, Mozambique, the [Malawian], Zimbabwe{an} Gray Baboon
- Ceratogyrus paulseni (Gallon, 2005) — Republic of South Africa
- Ceratogyrus pillansi (Purcell, 1902) — Zimbabwe, Mozambique
- Ceratogyrus sanderi (Strand, 1906) — Namibia, Zimbabwe, the [Namibian] Sandy Horned Baboon

Eucratoscelus (Pocock, 1898)
Type species: Eucratoscelus constrictus

Transferred to other genera:
Eucratoscelus tenuitibialis (Schmidt & Gelling, 2000) → Pterinochilus lugardi

In synonymy:
Eucratoscelus longiceps (Pocock, 1898) and Eucratoscelus spinifer = Eucratoscelus constrictus

- Eucratoscelus constrictus (Gerstäcker, 1873) — Kenya, Tanzania
- Eucratoscelus pachypus (Schmidt & Von Wirth, 1990) — Tanzania

Harpactira (Ausserer, 1871)
Type species: Harpactira atra

- Harpactira atra (Latreille, 1832) — South Africa
- Harpactira baviana (Purcell, 1903) — South Africa
- Harpactira cafreriana (Walckenaer, 1837) — South Africa
- Harpactira chrysogaster (Pocock, 1897) — South Africa
- Harpactira curator (Pocock, 1898) — South Africa
- Harpactira curvipes (Pocock, 1897) — South Africa
- Harpactira dictator (Purcell, 1902) — South Africa
- Harpactira gigas (Pocock, 1898) — South Africa
- Harpactira guttata (Strand, 1907) — South Africa
- Harpactira hamiltoni (Pocock, 1902) — South Africa
- Harpactira lineata (Pocock, 1897) — South Africa
- Harpactira lyrata (Simon, 1892) — South Africa
- Harpactira marksi (Purcell, 1902) — South Africa
- Harpactira namaquensis (Purcell, 1902) — Namibia, South Africa
- Harpactira pulchripes (Pocock, 1901) — South Africa, the [South African] Golden Blue Leg{ged} Baboon, Slate Gray Leg(ged) Baboon
- Harpactira tigrina (Ausserer, 1875) — South Africa

Harpactirella (Purcell, 1902) [Senior synonym of Luphocemus {Denis, 1960}]
Type species: Harpactirella treleaveni

Transferred to other genera:
Harpactirella flavipilosa (Lawrence, 1936) → Pterinochilus lugardi
Harpactirella latithorax (Strand, 1908) → Euathlus vulpinus
Harpactirella leleupi (Benoit, 1965) → Idiothele nigrofulva

- Harpactirella domicola (Purcell, 1903) — South Africa
- Harpactirella helenae (Purcell, 1903) — South Africa
- Harpactirella insidiosa (Denis, 1960) — Morocco (Dubious)
- Harpactirella karrooica (Purcell, 1902) — South Africa
- Harpactirella lapidaria (Purcell, 1908) — South Africa
- Harpactirella lightfooti (Purcell, 1902) — South Africa
- Harpactirella longipes (Purcell, 1902) — South Africa
- Harpactirella magna (Purcell, 1903) — South Africa
- Harpactirella overdijki (Gallon, 2010) — South Africa
- Harpactirella schwarzi (Purcell, 1904) — South Africa
- Harpactirella spinosa (Purcell, 1908) — South Africa
- Harpactirella treleaveni (Purcell, 1902) — South Africa

Idiothele (Hewitt, 1919)
Type species: Idiothele nigrofulva

In synonymy:
Idiothele crassispina (Purcell, 1902) and Idiothele leleupi (Benoit, 1965) = Idiothele nigrofulva

- Idiothele mira (Gallon, 2010) - South Africa, the South African Blue Footed Trapdoor Baboon
- Idiothele nigrofulva (Pocock, 1898) — Southern Africa

Pterinochilus (Pocock, 1897) [Senior synonym of Pterinochilides {Strand, 1920}]
Type species: Pterinochilus vorax

Transferred to other genera:
Pterinochilus breyeri → Augacephalus breyeri
Pterinochilus constrictus and Pterinochilus spinifer → Eucratoscelus constrictus
Pterinochilus crassispinus and Pterinochilus nigrofulvus → Idiothele nigrofulva
Pterinochilus junodi and Pterinochilus nigrifemur → Augacephalus junodi
Pterinochilus meridionalis → Ceratogyrus meridionalis
Pterinochilus schoenlandi → Trichognathella schoenlandi

In synonymy:
Pterinochilus affinis (Tullgren, 1910), Pterinochilus brunellii (Caporiacco, 1940), Pterinochilus carnivorus (Strand, 1917), Pterinochilus raptor (Strand, 1906), Pterinochilus raveni (Smith, 1990), Pterinochilus sjostedti (Tullgren, 1910), and Pterinochilus widenmanni (Strand, 1906) = Pterinochilus chordatus
Pterinochilus flavipilosus (Lawrence, 1936), Pterinochilus pluridentatus (Hewitt, 1919), and Pterinochilus tenuitibialis = Pterinochilus lugardi
Pterinochilus hindei (Hirst, 1907), Pterinochilus leetzi (Schmidt, 2002), and Pterinochilus mamillatus (Strand, 1906) = Pterinochilus murinus
Pterinochilus mutus (Strand, 1920), Pterinochilus obenbergeri (Strand, 1920), and Pterinochilus occidentalis (Strand, 1920) = Pterinochilus simoni

- Pterinochilus alluaudi (Berland, 1914) — Kenya
- Pterinochilus andrewsmithi (Gallon, 2009) — Northwestern Kenya
- Pterinochilus chordatus (Gerstäcker, 1873) — East Africa, the Kilimanjaro Mustard Baboon
- Pterinochilus cryptus (Gallon, 2008) — Angola
- Pterinochilus lapalala (Gallon & Engelbrecht, 2011) — Waterberg mountains of Limpopo Province, South Africa
- Pterinochilus lugardi (Pocock, 1900) — Eastern and Southern Africa, the Dodoma Fort Hall Baboon
- Pterinochilus murinus (Pocock, 1897) — Angola, Central, Eastern, Southern Africa, the Usumbara Orange Baboon, Mombasa Golden Starburst [Baboon], "OBT"
- Pterinochilus raygabrieli (Gallon, 2009) — Southcentral Kenya
- Pterinochilus simoni (Berland, 1917) — Angola, Congo
- Pterinochilus vorax (Pocock, 1897) — Angola, Central, East Africa

Trichognathella (Gallon, 2004) [Monotypic?]

- Trichognathella schoenlandi (Pocock, 1900) — South Africa

== In pop culture ==
The writer and philologist, J. R. R. Tolkien, was bitten by a large baboon spider in 1890s during his youth. Some believe that this influenced his published stories as an adult
