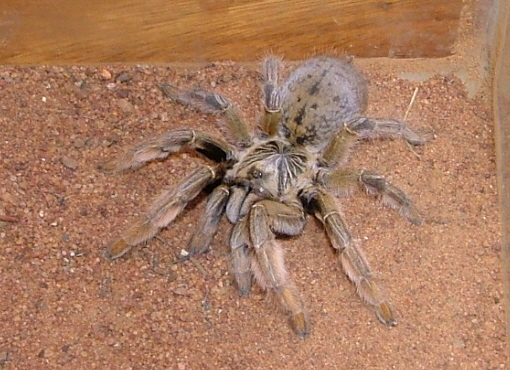
- A. junodi
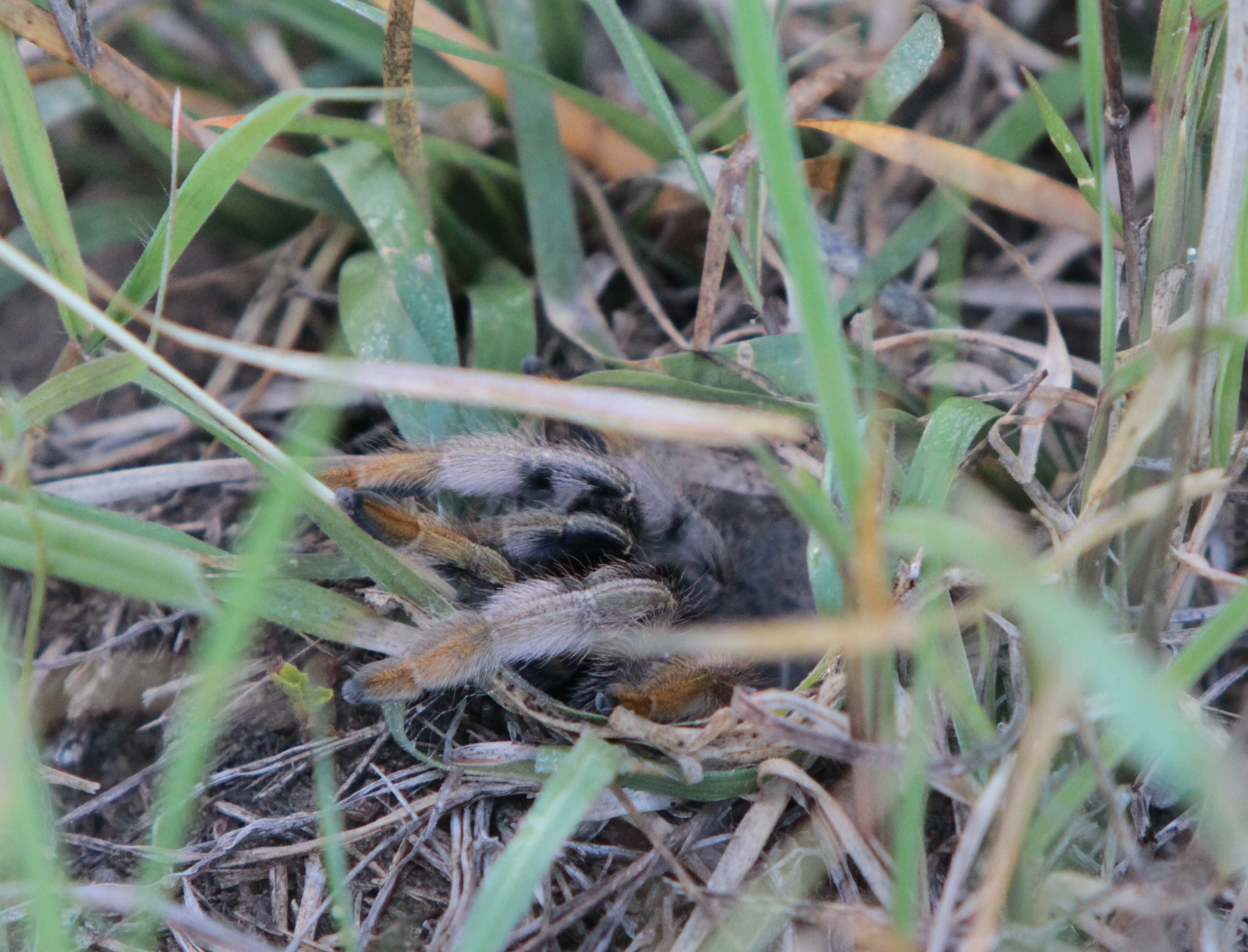
- A. breyeri

Scientific classification
- Kingdom: Animalia
- Phylum: Arthropoda
- Subphylum: Chelicerata
- Class: Arachnida
- Order: Araneae
- Infraorder: Mygalomorphae
- Family: Theraphosidae
- Subfamily: Harpactirinae
- Genus: Augacephalus; Gallon, 2002

Species
- see text

Diversity
- 3 species

= Augacephalus =

Genus of spiders

Augacephalus is a genus of harpacterine theraphosid spiders. Its three species are found in Africa.

== Taxonomy and etymology ==
The type species of Augacephalus is A. breyeri which was described as Pterinochilus breyeri by Hewitt in 1919. In 2002, Gallon placed it a new genus, which he erected in the same paper, Augacephalus.

Its name comes from the Greek αυγή auga meaning "sun rays" and κεφᾰλή kephale meaning "head" which refers to the prominent, radial cephalothorax striae present in most species.

== Natural history ==
All known species are fossorial and females lay eggs in a hammock egg-sack which yield about 95 spiderlings.

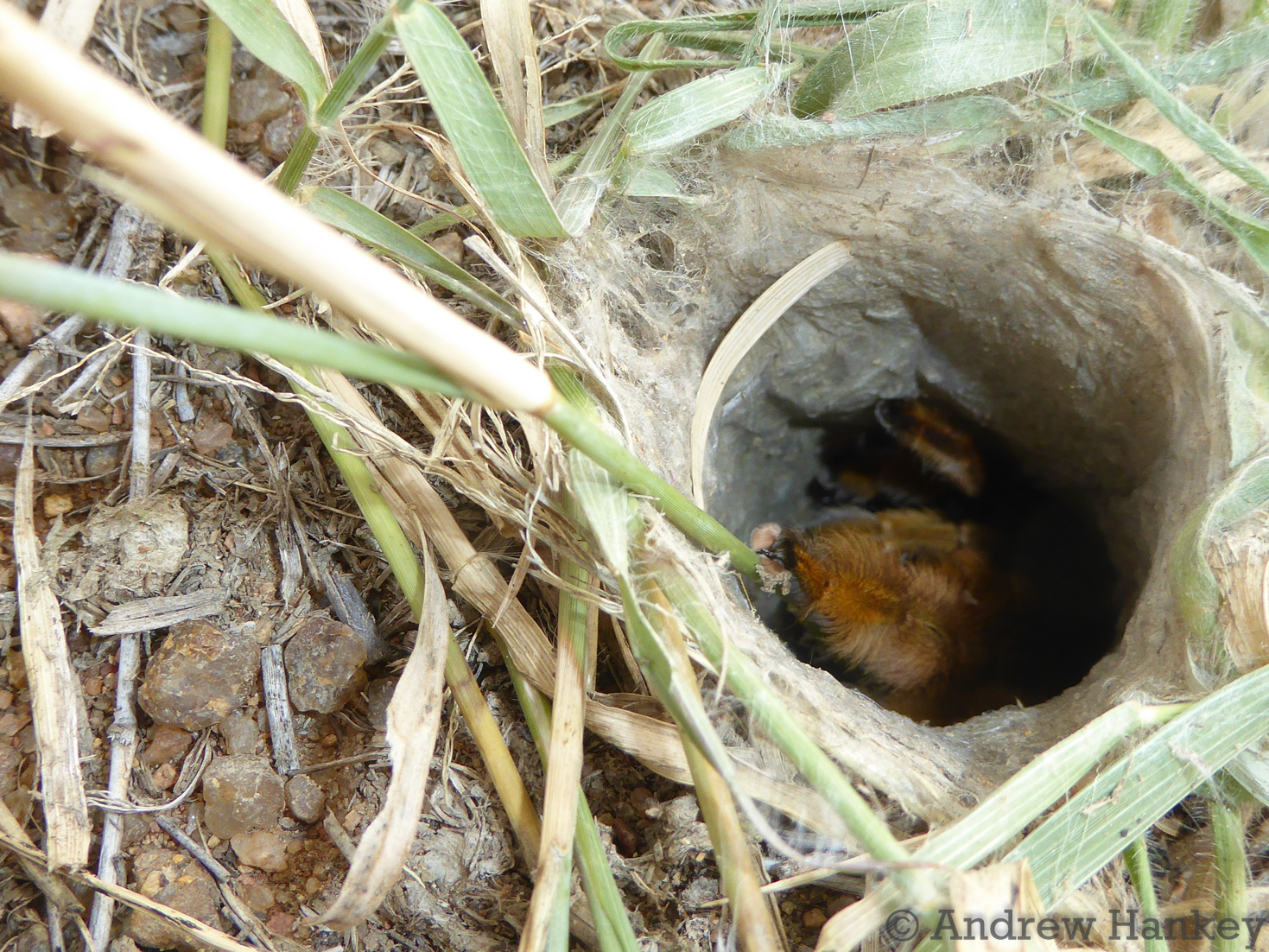
A. junodi in burrow

== Diagnosis ==
Augacephalus is separated from other harpactirines in the following ways: Distinguished from Harpactirella by the presence of a retrolateral cheliceral scopula composed of plumose setae (in males scopula not obviously composed of plumose setae). Separated from Harpactira and Trichognatha by the absence of a dense scopula on the upper prolateral cheliceral surface. Further separated from Harpactira by the absence of plumose stridulatory strikers on the prolateral maxillary surface, and by the absence of a discrete row of bristles below the retrolateral cheliceral scopula. Distinguished from Idiothele by the possession of digitiform distal segment on posterior spinnerets. Differs from Ceratogyrus by the lack of a foveal tubercle/procurved fovea. Female Augacephalus are separated from those of Eucratoscelus by the unmodified (not incrassate) tibiae of leg IV. Male Augacephalus are separated from those of Eucratoscelus and Pterinochilus by lacking the distal proventral tibial apophysis or by the reduced surmounted megaspine. Further separated from Eucratoscelus by the absence of a distal proventral tumid protuberance on metatarsus I. The presence of a distal prodorsal spine on metatarsi III and IV further separates Augacephalus from Eucratoscelus. Female Augacephalus are separated from those of Pterinochilus by the absence of long emergent setae on the chelicerae (giving them a velvety appearance), their robust palpi and legs I–II, and by the position of their posterior sternal sigilla (an impressed sclerotized spot).

== Species ==
As of October 2025, this genus includes three species:

- Augacephalus breyeri (Hewitt, 1919) – South Africa, Mozambique, Eswatini (type species)
- Augacephalus ezendami (Gallon, 2001) – Mozambique
- Augacephalus junodi (Simon, 1904) – Namibia, South Africa
