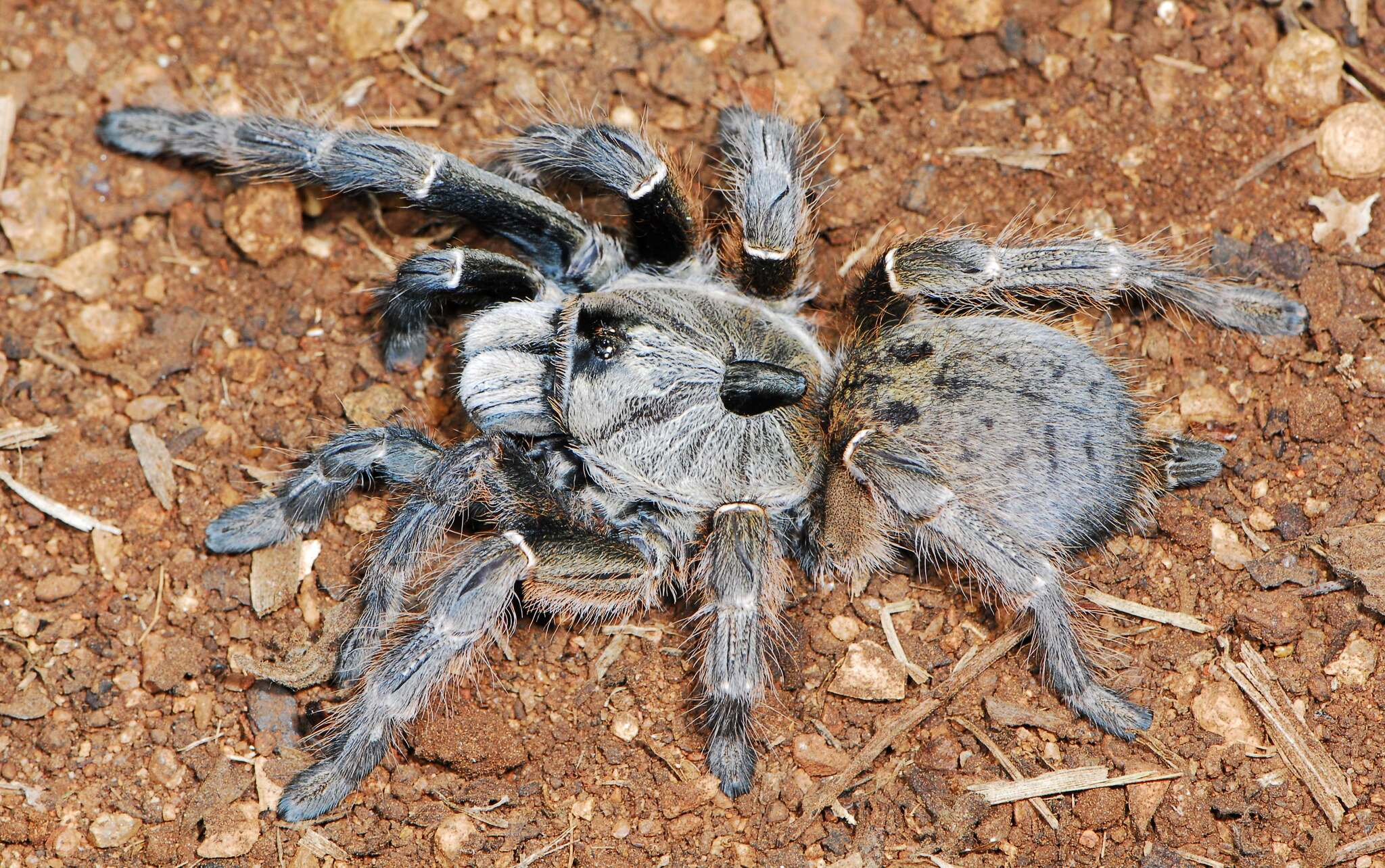
- female C. darlingi
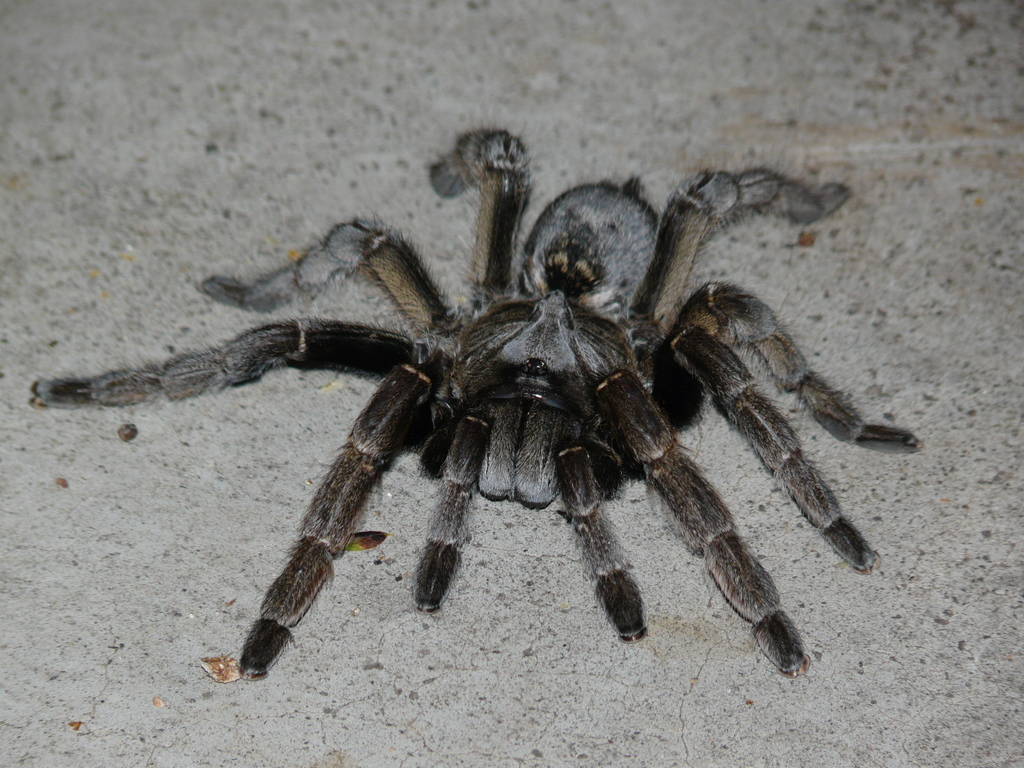
- C. dolichocephalus

Scientific classification
- Kingdom: Animalia
- Phylum: Arthropoda
- Subphylum: Chelicerata
- Class: Arachnida
- Order: Araneae
- Infraorder: Mygalomorphae
- Family: Theraphosidae
- Genus: Ceratogyrus; Pocock, 1897

Species
- 10, species text.

Synonyms
- Coelogenium Purcell, 1902

= Ceratogyrus =

Horned Baboons

Genus of spiders

Ceratogyrus is a genus of tarantulas found in southern Africa. They are commonly called horned baboons for the foveal horn found on the peltidium in some species.

== Diagnosis ==
They are readily distinguished from other African theraphosid genera by the combined presence of a retrolateral cheliceral scopula, composed of plumose, stridulatory setae, and the strongly procurved fovea. The fovea is typically strongly procurved and in some species surrounds a distinct protuberance. This protuberance may take the form of a simple posterior extension of the caput, a low-set plug or a prominent, discrete conical projection. All Ceratogyrus species possess a pale yellow anteriorly placed, transverse, sub-abdominal band. This feature is not distinct in other Harpatirinae except Augacephalus junodi. The absence of dense, ventral femoral fringes on the palpi and legs I and II distinguish Ceratogyrus spp. from female A. junodi.

== Horn function ==
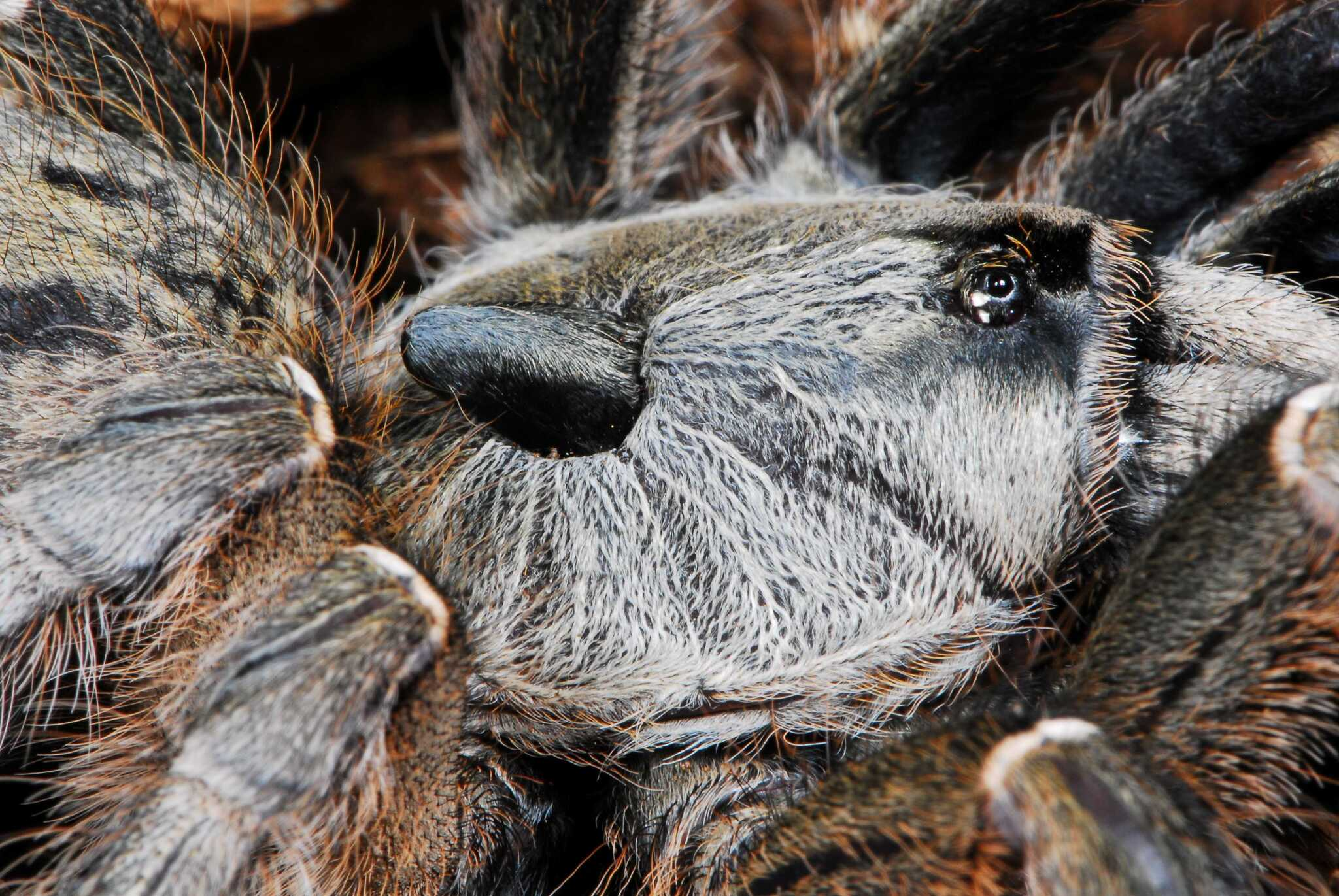
Detail of female C. darlingi

The horn of C. marshalli stands straight up about 1 cm in an adult. There are several probable functions for this horn: according to a study by Rick C. West in 1986, it provides an increased surface for the attachment of the dorsal dilator muscle, which aids in drawing in liquefied food into the sucking stomach at a faster rate; this way, the spider can retreat to a safe place faster. It also increases the area for the midgut diverticula to expand during times of nutrient and water availability, analogous to a camel's hump, helping it to survive in its arid habitat during droughts.

== Species ==
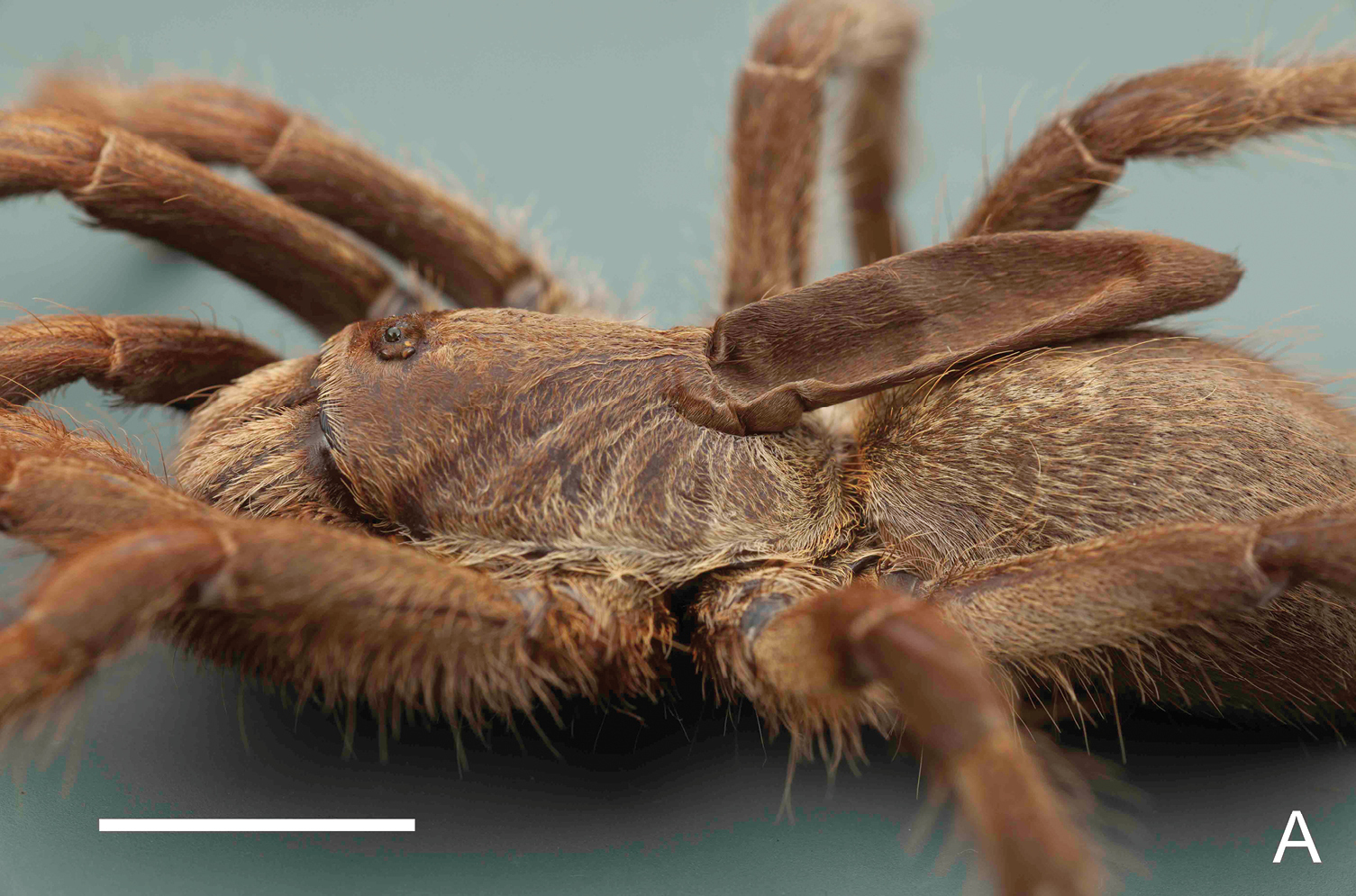
C. attonitifer

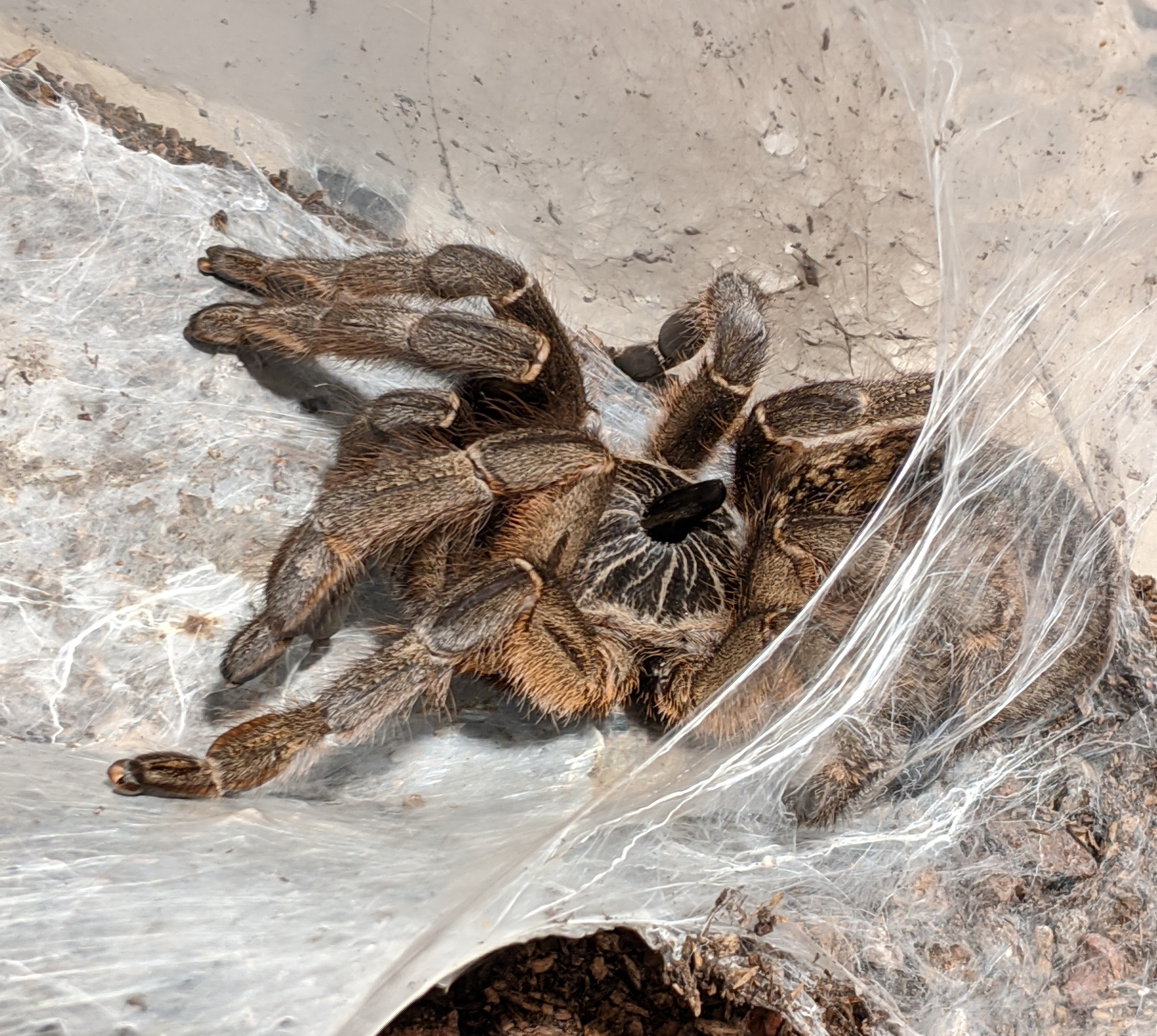
C. marshalli

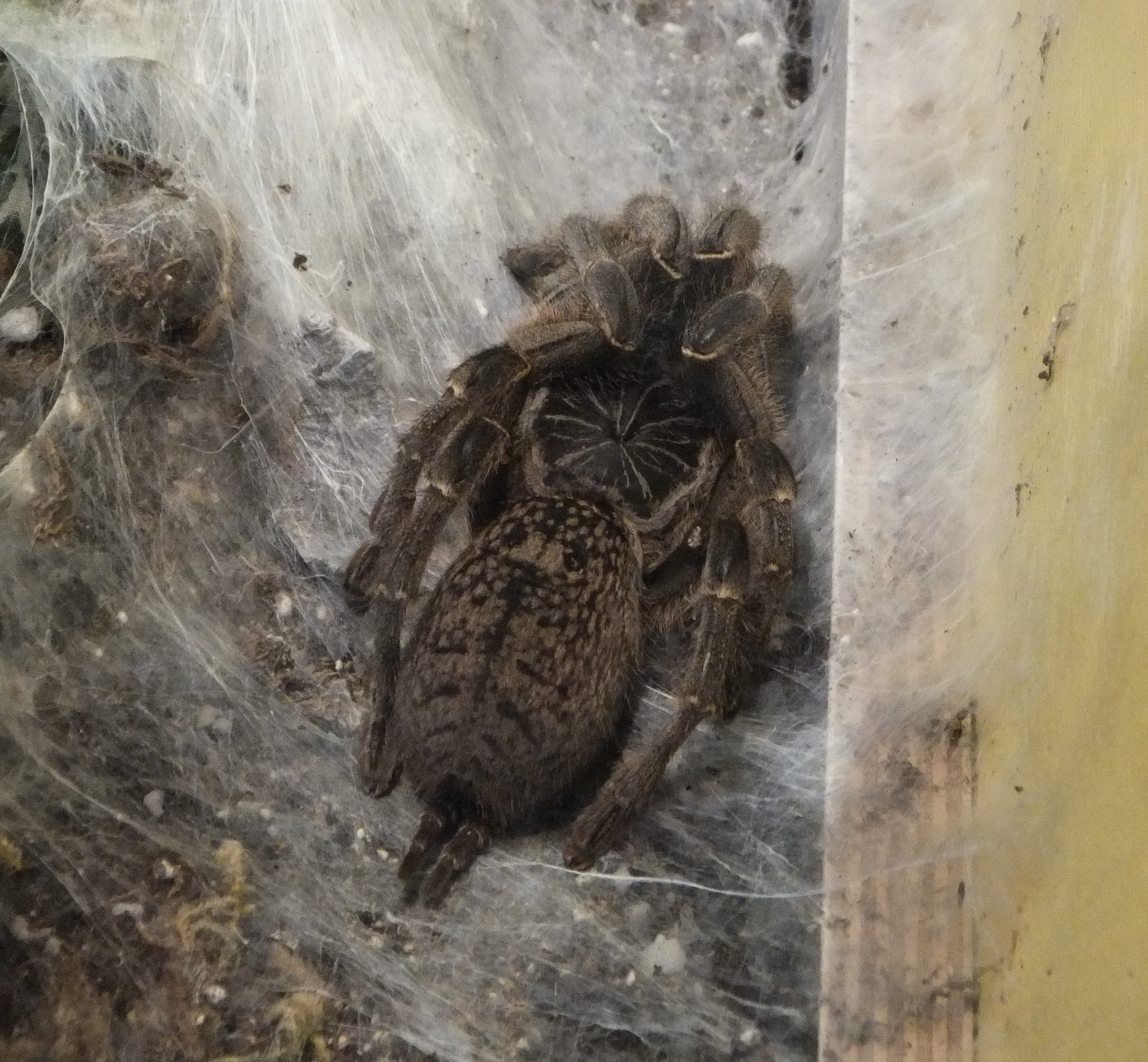
C. meridionalis

As of October 2025, this genus includes ten species:

- Ceratogyrus attonitifer Engelbrecht, 2019 – Angola
- Ceratogyrus brachycephalus Hewitt, 1919 – Botswana, Zimbabwe, South Africa
- Ceratogyrus darlingi Pocock, 1897 – Southern Africa (type species)
- Ceratogyrus dolichocephalus Hewitt, 1919 – Zimbabwe
- Ceratogyrus hillyardi (Smith, 1990) – Malawi
- Ceratogyrus marshalli Pocock, 1897 – Zimbabwe, Mozambique
- Ceratogyrus meridionalis (Hirst, 1907) – Malawi, Mozambique
- Ceratogyrus paulseni Gallon, 2005 – South Africa
- Ceratogyrus pillansi (Purcell, 1902) – Zimbabwe, Mozambique
- Ceratogyrus sanderi Strand, 1906 – Namibia, Zimbabwe

In synonymy

- Ceratogyrus bechuanicus (Purcell, 1902) = Ceratogyrus darlingi
- Ceratogyrus cornuatus (De Wet & Dippenaar-Schoeman, 1991) = Ceratogyrus marshalli
- Ceratogyrus schultzei Purcell, 1908 = Ceratogyrus darlingi

Transferred to other genera

- Ceratogyrus ezendami Gallon, 2001 → Augacephalus ezendami
- Ceratogyrus nigrifemur (Schmidt, 1995) → Augacephalus junodi
- Ceratogyrus raveni (Smith, 1990) → Pterinochilus chordatus
