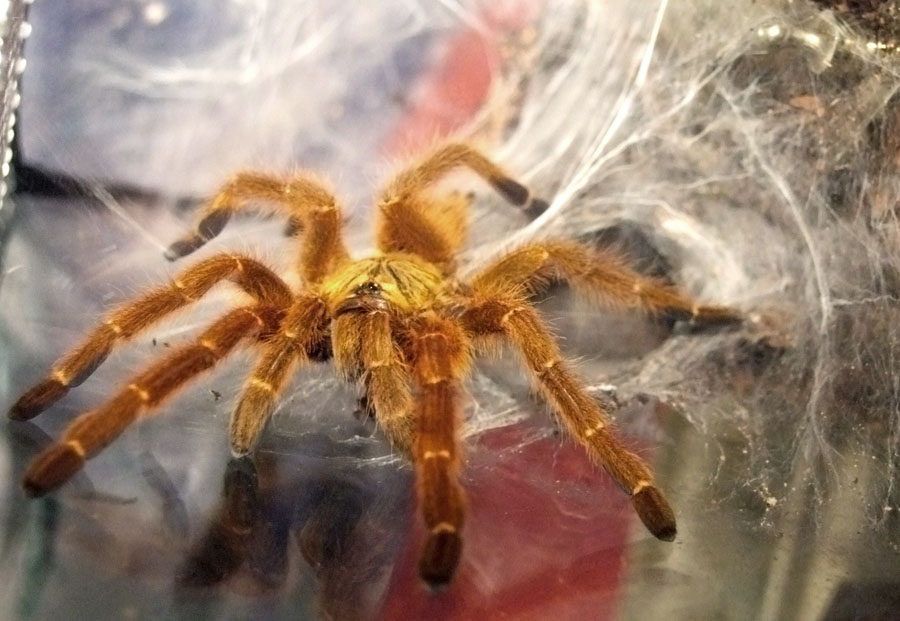
- P. murinus
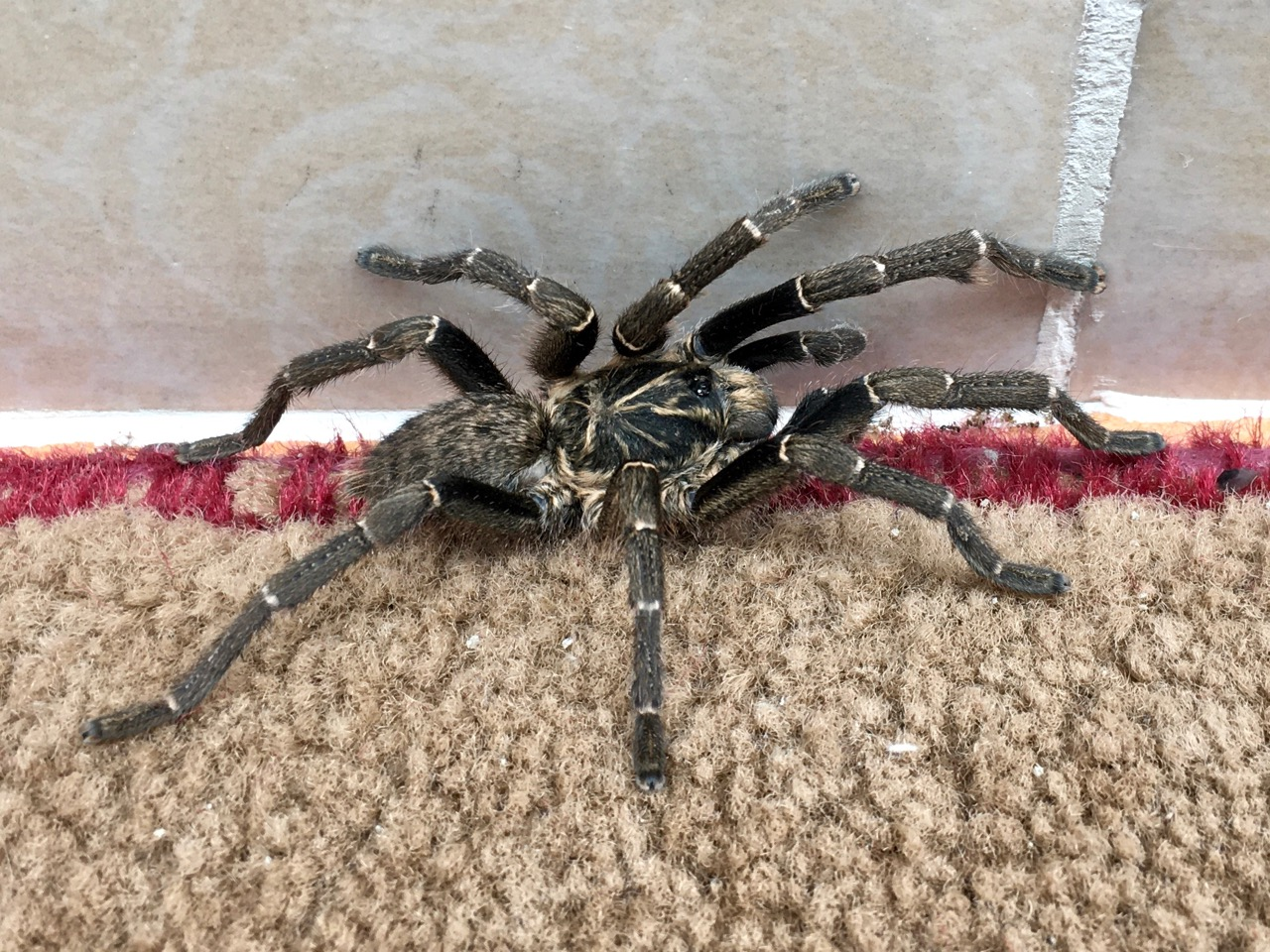
- P. chordatus

Scientific classification
- Kingdom: Animalia
- Phylum: Arthropoda
- Subphylum: Chelicerata
- Class: Arachnida
- Order: Araneae
- Infraorder: Mygalomorphae
- Family: Theraphosidae
- Genus: Pterinochilus; Pocock, 1897

Type species
- P. vorax Pocock, 1897

Species
- 10, see text

Synonyms
- Pterinochilides Strand, 1920

= Pterinochilus =

Genus of spiders

Pterinochilus is a genus of baboon spiders that was first described by Reginald Innes Pocock in 1897. They are found all throughout Africa.

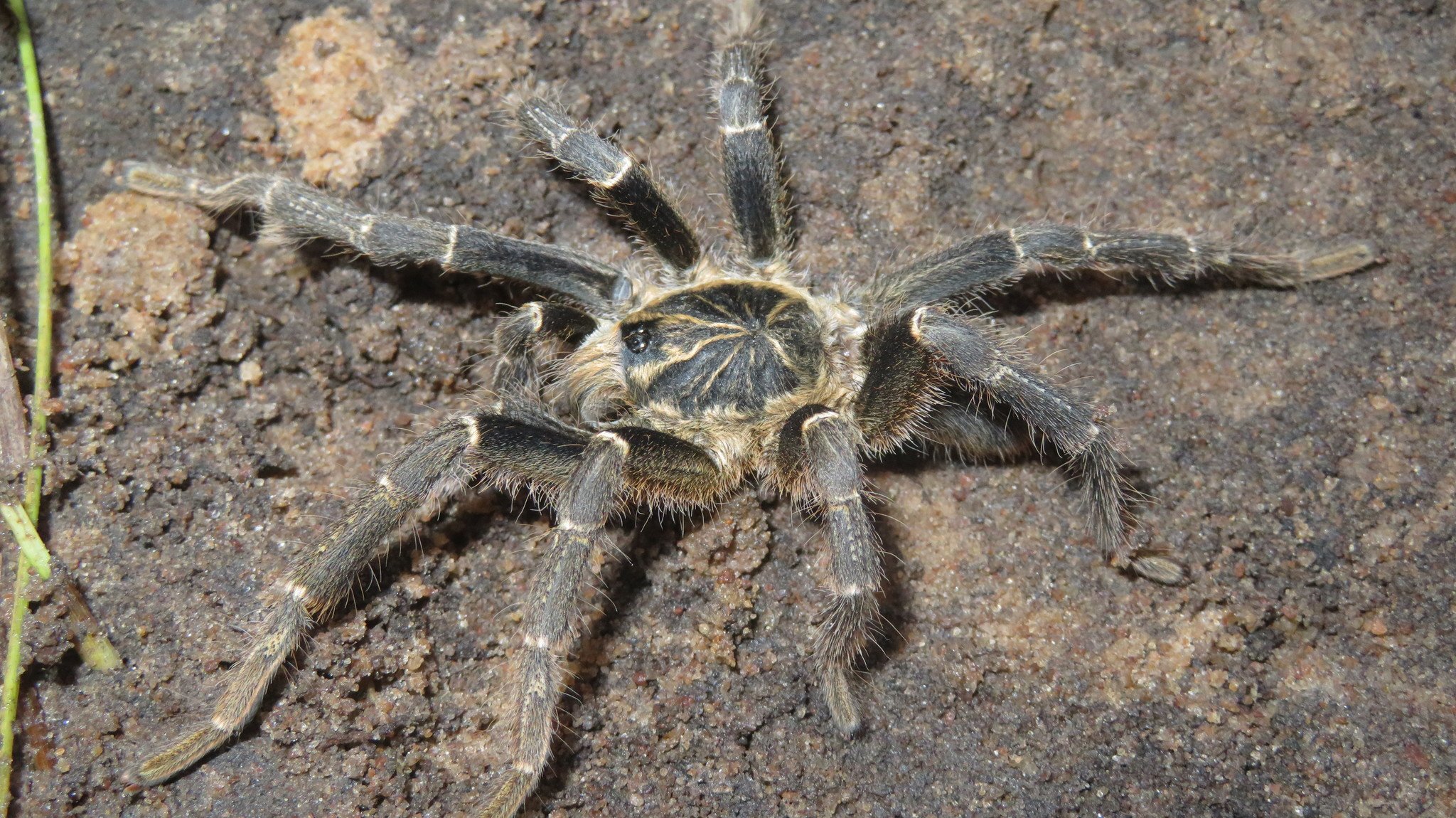
P. vorax

== Species ==
As of October 2025, this genus includes ten species:

- Pterinochilus alluaudi Berland, 1914 – Kenya
- Pterinochilus andrewsmithi Gallon, 2009 – Kenya
- Pterinochilus chordatus (Gerstaecker, 1873) – South Sudan, Ethiopia, Somalia, Uganda, Kenya, Tanzania
- Pterinochilus cryptus Gallon, 2008 – Angola
- Pterinochilus lapalala Gallon & Engelbrecht, 2011 – South Africa
- Pterinochilus lugardi Pocock, 1900 – Tanzania, Zambia, Namibia, Botswana, Zimbabwe, South Africa
- Pterinochilus murinus Pocock, 1897 – DR Congo, Burundi, Kenya, Tanzania, Angola, Zambia, Mozambique, Zimbabwe, South Africa
- Pterinochilus raygabrieli Gallon, 2009 – Ethiopia, Kenya
- Pterinochilus simoni Berland, 1917 – DR Congo, Angola
- Pterinochilus vorax Pocock, 1897 – DR Congo, Rwanda, Burundi, Tanzania, Angola (type species)

=== In synonymy ===
- Pterinochilus affinis Tullgren, 1910 = Pterinochilus chordatus
- Pterinochilus brunellii Caporiacco, 1940 = Pterinochilus chordatus
- Pterinochilus carnivorus Strand, 1917 = Pterinochilus chordatus
- Pterinochilus flavipilosus (Lawrence, 1936) = Pterinochilus lugardi
- Pterinochilus hindei Hirst, 1907 = Pterinochilus murinus
- Pterinochilus leetzi Schmidt, 2002 = Pterinochilus murinus
- Pterinochilus mamillatus Strand, 1906 = Pterinochilus murinus
- Pterinochilus mutus Strand, 1920 = Pterinochilus simoni
- Pterinochilus obenbergeri (Strand, 1920) = Pterinochilus simoni
- Pterinochilus occidentalis Strand, 1920 = Pterinochilus simoni
- Pterinochilus pluridentatus (Hewitt, 1919) = Pterinochilus lugardi
- Pterinochilus raptor Strand, 1906 = Pterinochilus chordatus
- Pterinochilus raveni (Smith, 1990) = Pterinochilus chordatus
- Pterinochilus sjostedti Tullgren, 1910 = Pterinochilus chordatus
- Pterinochilus tenuitibialis (Schmidt & Gelling, 2000) = Pterinochilus lugardi
- Pterinochilus widenmanni Strand, 1906 = Pterinochilus chordatus

=== Formerly included ===
- P. breyeri Hewitt, 1919 → Augacephalus breyeri
- P. constrictus (Gerstäcker, 1873) → Eucratoscelus constrictus
- P. crassispinus Purcell, 1902 → Idiothele nigrofulva
- P. junodi Simon, 1904 → Augacephalus junodi
- P. meridionalis Hirst, 1907 → Ceratogyrus meridionalis
- P. nigrifemur (Schmidt, 1995) → Augacephalus junodi
- P. nigrofulvus Pocock, 1898 → Idiothele nigrofulva
- P. schoenlandi Pocock, 1900 → Trichognathella schoenlandi
- P. spinifer Pocock, 1898 → Eucratoscelus constrictus
