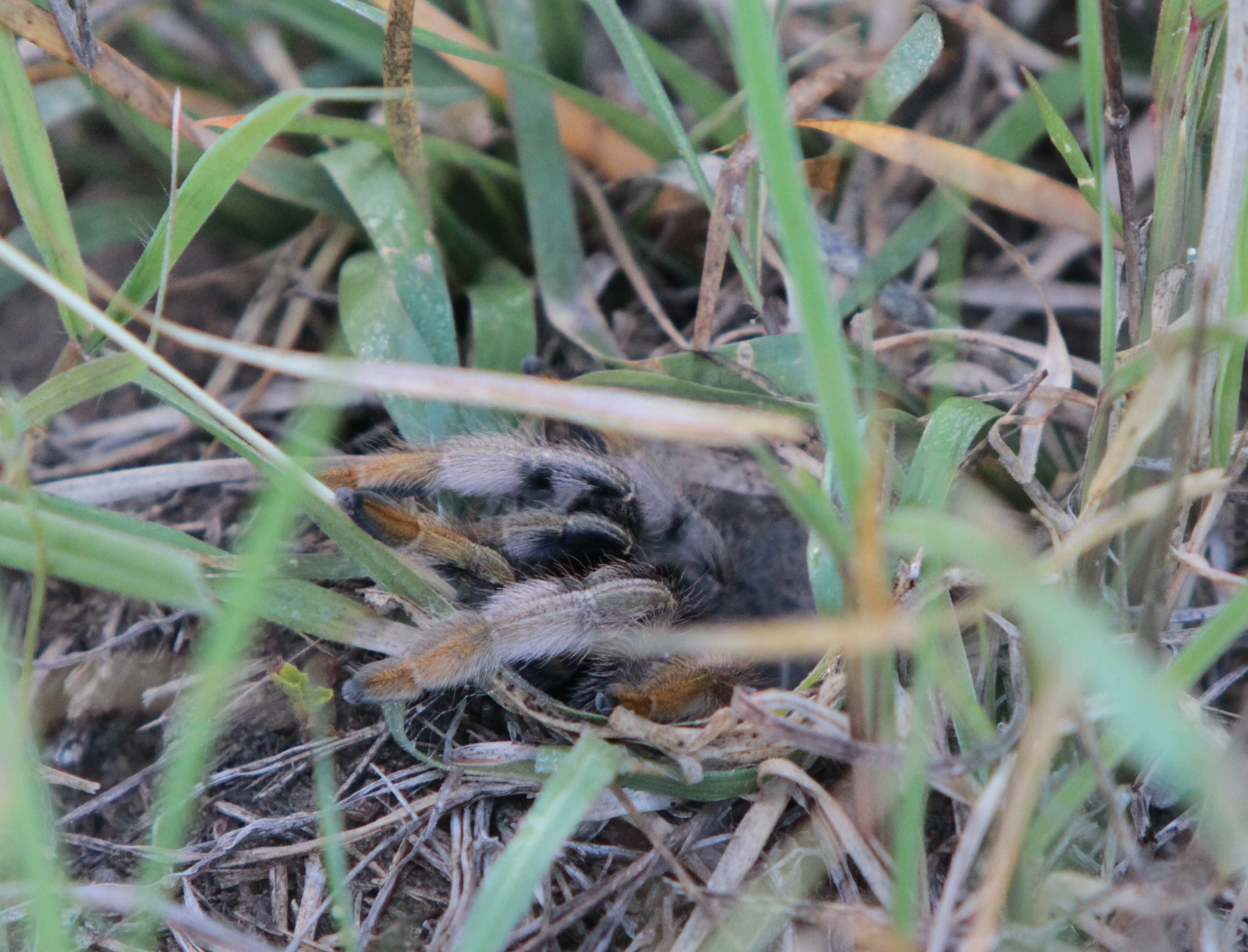
- A. breyeri

Scientific classification
- Kingdom: Animalia
- Phylum: Arthropoda
- Subphylum: Chelicerata
- Class: Arachnida
- Order: Araneae
- Infraorder: Mygalomorphae
- Family: Theraphosidae
- Genus: Augacephalus
- Species: A. breyeri

Binomial name
- Augacephalus breyeri Hewitt, 1919

Synonyms
- Pterinochilus

= Augacephalus breyeri =

Species of spider

Augacephalus breyeri is a species of harpactirine theraphosid spider, found in South Africa, Mozambique and Eswatini.

== Description ==
Augacephalus breyeri females are 40-55mm in total length. The cephalothorax is 15-22mm long and 12-18mm wide, and sometimes has a "step" separating the cephalic region from the fovea. The cephalothorax has a radial pattern of orange striae set on a background of black setae, and the cephalic region has a black "mask". The fovea is shallow. There are long emergent setae on the sternum and coxae. The spermathecae are flattened and triangular. The abdomen (opisthosoma) is 18.8–27.2mm long and 12.9–19.4mm wide. Its dorsal surface is orange/beige with a dark pattern of spots, bars and reticulations. The legs and palpi are orange or beige.

Male Augacephalus breyeri have a megaspine surmounting a distal proventral tibial apophysis. They have relatively robust embolus. The total length of the male is 18mm. The cephalothorax is 8.4mm long and 6.7mm wide. Cephalothorax colouration same as female. Abdomen length 7.9mm and width 4.1mm. Abdomen, legs and palpi are light brown.

== Natural history ==
A. breyeri is fossorial and inhabits thornveld grassland. It lives in burrows about 20 cm deep.

== Taxonomy ==
Augacephalus breyeri was described by John Hewitt, as Pterinochilus breyeri, in 1919. Richard Gallon transferred the species to Augacephalus in 2002.
