= Pterinochilus cryptus =

Scientific classification
- Kingdom: Animalia
- Phylum: Arthropoda
- Subphylum: Chelicerata
- Class: Arachnida
- Order: Araneae
- Infraorder: Mygalomorphae
- Family: Theraphosidae
- Genus: Pterinochilus
- Species: P. cryptus

Binomial name
- Pterinochilus cryptus Gallon, 2008

Species of tarantula

Pterinochilus cryptus is a tarantula in the Pterinochilus genus. It was first described by Richard C. Gallon in 2008. It is found in Lucira, Angola in Namibe province, and is named after the Greek word for hidden, since they were originally misidentified as atypical specimens of P. murinus. They were misidentified as it was thought they had palpal regrowth.

== Characteristics ==
The palpal bulb is gently curved embolus, the absence of an inflected embolic tip and, the absence of a row of stiffened hairs in the scopula are the primary identification factors of this tarantula. Chelicerae, legs, and abdomen are a yellowish brown color, the carapace with badly distinguishable yellowish brown radial striae. Their ecology is mainly unknown, though it was observed that males are mature in September.

== Habitat ==
It is found roughly in the Namibian savanna woodlands and the Kaokoveld desert. These regions are known for their arid and semi-arid climates, where it mainly rains in the summer. Average annual rainfall varies from 60 to 200 mm, with average temperatures being 24 °C.
