= Luphocemus =

Scientific classification
- Kingdom: Animalia
- Phylum: Arthropoda
- Subphylum: Chelicerata
- Class: Arachnida
- Order: Araneae
- Infraorder: Mygalomorphae
- Family: Theraphosidae
- Genus: Luphocemus; Denis, 1960

Species
- See text.

Genus of spiders

Luphocemus is a genus of small to medium sized tarantulas with a robust body.

== Taxonomy ==
The genus was first described in 1960 when it was placed in the family Barychelidae. The only species was Luphocemus insidiosus. In 1965, the genus was sunk into Harpactirella, and L. insidiosus became Harpactirella insidiosa. In 2022, H. insidiosa was considered to be a synonym of Ischnocolus elongatus, so Luphocemus became a synonym of Ischnocolus. In 2026, the genus was resurrected with two species, the original L. insidiosus plus L. elongata. They can be differentiated by their morphological characteristics and their lifestyle. They construct a tube burrow which is lined with dense web, and has side chambers and a small turret around the entrance.

=== Species ===
As of March 2026, this genus contained two species, both found in Morocco:

- Luphocemus elongatus (Simon, 1873)
- Luphocemus insidiosus Denis, 1960
