= Bacillochilus =

Scientific classification
- Kingdom: Animalia
- Phylum: Arthropoda
- Subphylum: Chelicerata
- Class: Arachnida
- Order: Araneae
- Infraorder: Mygalomorphae
- Family: Theraphosidae
- Genus: Bacillochilus; Gallon, 2010
- Species: B. xenostridulans

Binomial name
- Bacillochilus xenostridulans Gallon, 2010

Genus of spiders

Bacillochilus is a monotypic genus of African tarantulas containing the single species, Bacillochilus xenostridulans. The genus and sole species were both described by R. C. Gallon in 2010, and is found in Angola. The name is a combination of the Ancient Greek "xénos" (ξενος), meaning "foreign" or "strange", and the Latin "stridulere", meaning "to creak". It is a reference to the unusual form of the stridulatory organ that distinguishes it from other members of the subfamily Harpactirinae.

Its unique stridulating organ consists of a long scopula surrounded by plumose setae on the retrolateral side of the chelicerae. It can be further distinguished by the a transverse fovea, multiple lobes on the maxillae and labium, a long distal segment of spinnerets, and the lack of a prolateral cheliceral scopula.
