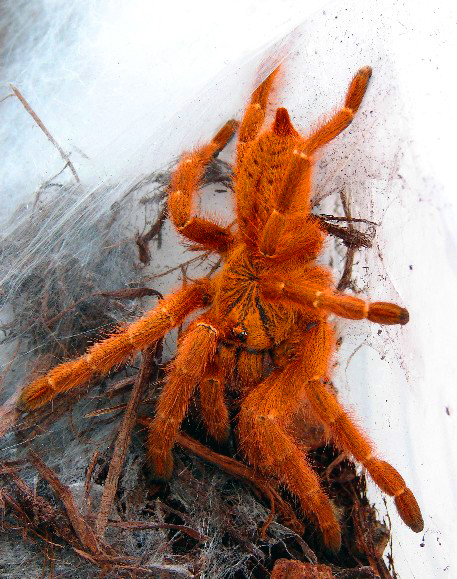

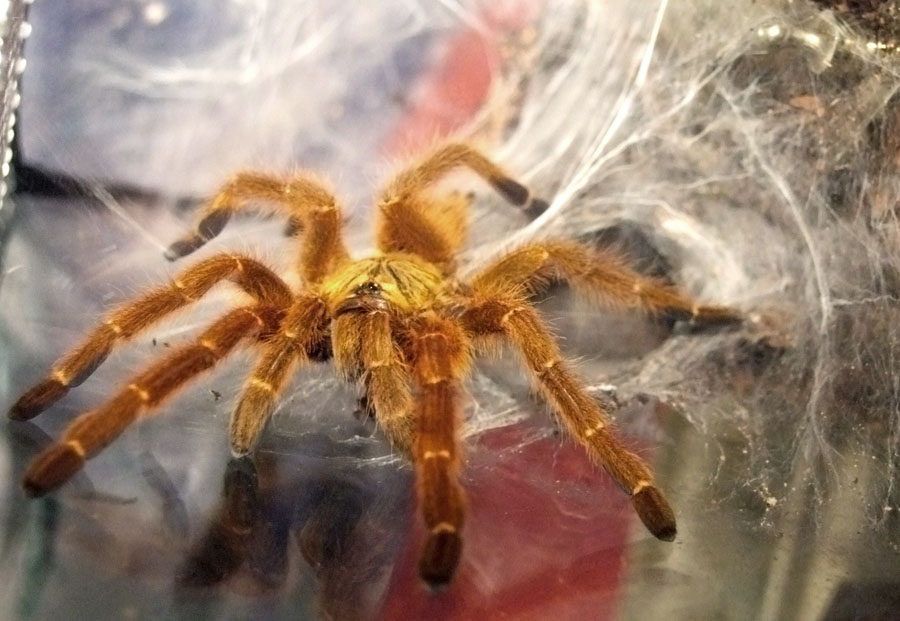

Scientific classification
- Kingdom: Animalia
- Phylum: Arthropoda
- Subphylum: Chelicerata
- Class: Arachnida
- Order: Araneae
- Infraorder: Mygalomorphae
- Family: Theraphosidae
- Genus: Pterinochilus
- Species: P. murinus

Binomial name
- Pterinochilus murinus (Pocock, 1897)

Synonyms
- Harpactira elevata Karsch, 1878; Pterinochilus mamillatus Strand, 1906; Pterinochilus hindei Hirst, 1907; Pterinochilus vosseleri Strand, 1907; Pterinochilus leetzi Schmidt, 2002

= Pterinochilus murinus =

Species of spider

Pterinochilus murinus or the orange baboon tarantula, is a nocturnal spider in the family Theraphosidae that was first described in 1897 by Reginald Innes Pocock. This species is found in Angola, as well as central and southern Africa. It is a member of the subfamily Harpactirinae, baboon spiders.

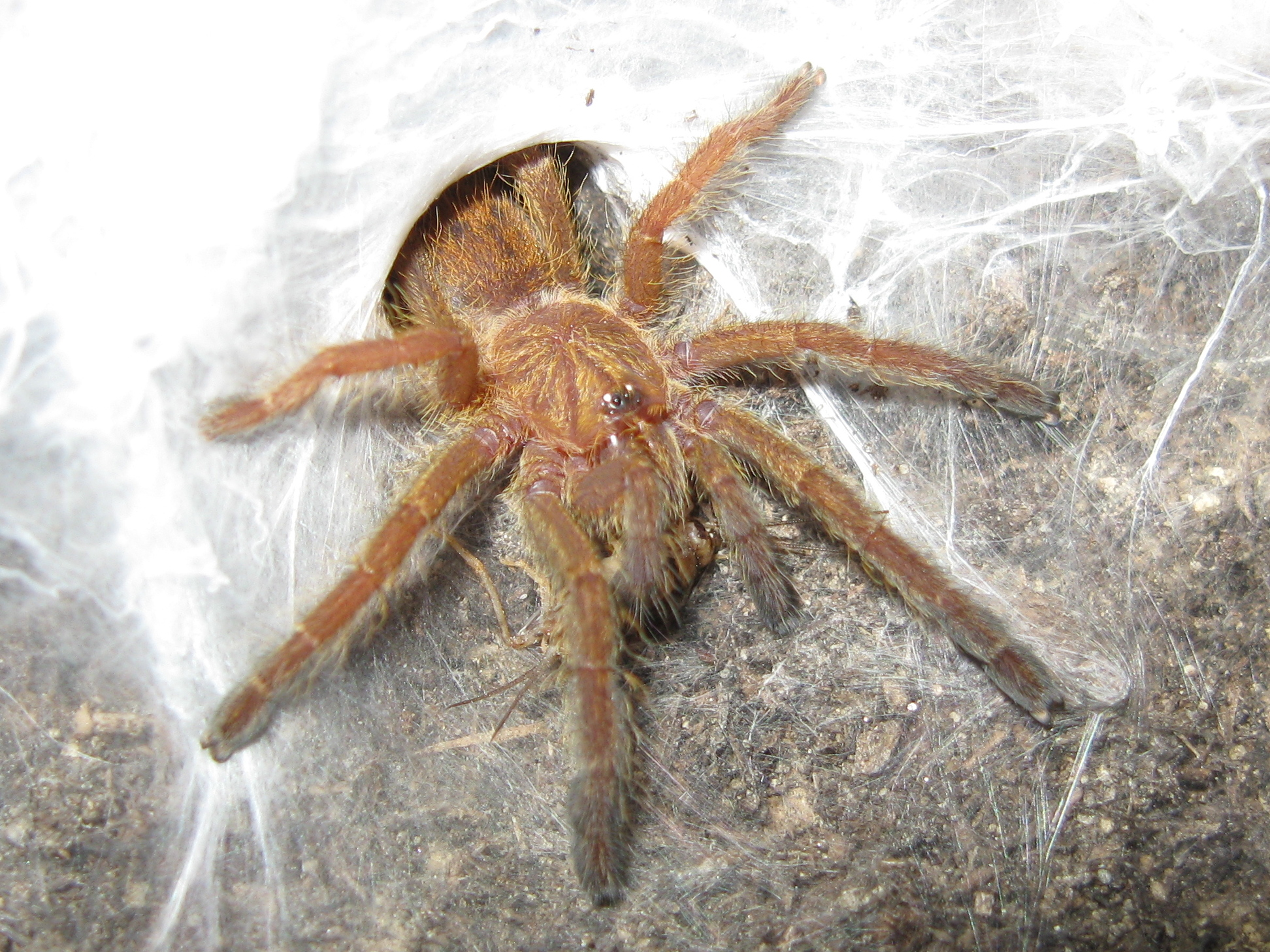
A juvenile Pterinochilus murinus showing brownish orange coloration.

The color varies from red, orange and brown.

Among those who keep tarantulas as pets, Pterinochilus murinus is known as "OBT", acronym which stands for "orange baboon tarantula" or "orange bitey thing", and also as the "pterror", a pun on its Latin genus classification of Pterinochilus. These nicknames reference a particular orange colour form that is prized in the hobby for its beauty, as well as its painful bite. It is also known as the Mombasa golden starburst tarantula.

This species is incredibly defensive and, as with most old world tarantulas, should not be held. The bite of this species, while not serious, is extremely painful. Moreover, the species is more than willing to inflict such a bite without first presenting the typical threat display. Caution when dealing with this species is strongly advised.

== Description ==
Female P. murinus can grow to 4–6 inches (10–15 cm) in size (measured from the tip of the front left leg, to the tip of the rear right leg), while males typically range from 3–4 inches (7.5–10 cm). The spider's abdomen, carapace, and legs have the same basic coloration, though the legs typically have brightly colored rings. The carapace has a star-shaped pattern, with a fishbone pattern present on the abdomen. The eyes are clustered together on a raised part of the carapace (in common with all tarantulas). The body is covered with short hairs, with longer hair present on the legs. Urticating hairs are not present.

There are currently 5 known colour variants of Pterinochilus murinus: and also localities of those as listed after the color form names.

- BCF - Brown Colour Form - Tete, Mozambique
- DCF - Dark Colour Form - Botswana/Zimbabwe, Kenya, Kigoma, Mikumi
- OCF - Orange Colour Form - Usambara Mountains Region (used to be called UMW before RCF was found)
- RCF - Red Colour Form - Usambara Mountains Region
- TCF - Typical Colour Form - Kenya, Mozambique

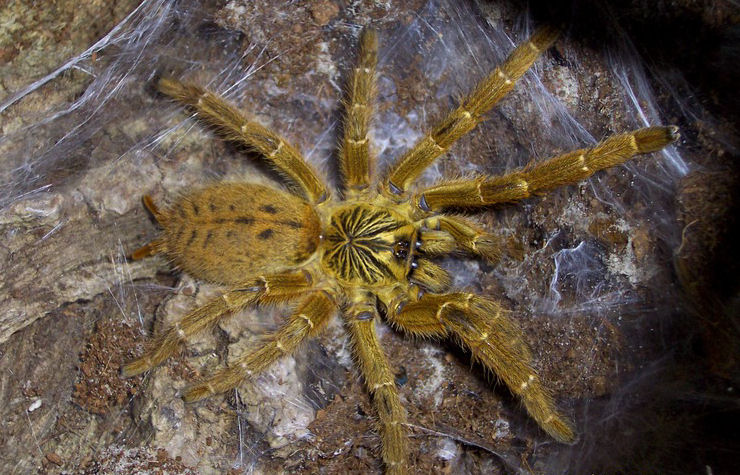
Pterinochilus murinus BCF showing brownish yellow coloration.

These colour variants are found in different geographical locations, and the colouration is thought to be related to the type of soil present where each variant lives.

== Distribution ==
Pternochilus murinus is found in different parts of Africa and has also been recorded on the island of Zanzibar.

== Behavior ==
The orange baboon tarantula is very defensive, and will bite if provoked. Consequently, it is not recommended that hobbyists keep this species without extensive prior experience handling venomous spiders.

The female excavates a burrow, or colonizes an existing burrow that has been abandoned.

== As pets ==
These spiders are not common in pet stores but are very popular in the pet trade. These spiders build a tunnel shaped web and as adults should be provided around 2 - 3 inches of substrate. They are commonly fed crickets, cockroaches, and grasshoppers. Though they can kill small vertebrates (mice, small lizards, birds, snakes), these feeder animals are not commonly used in captive care.

These spiders can be very defensive and have very painful bites. Although their venom is not known to be lethal to humans, it is considered medically significant and thus it is advised to avoid handling this species.
