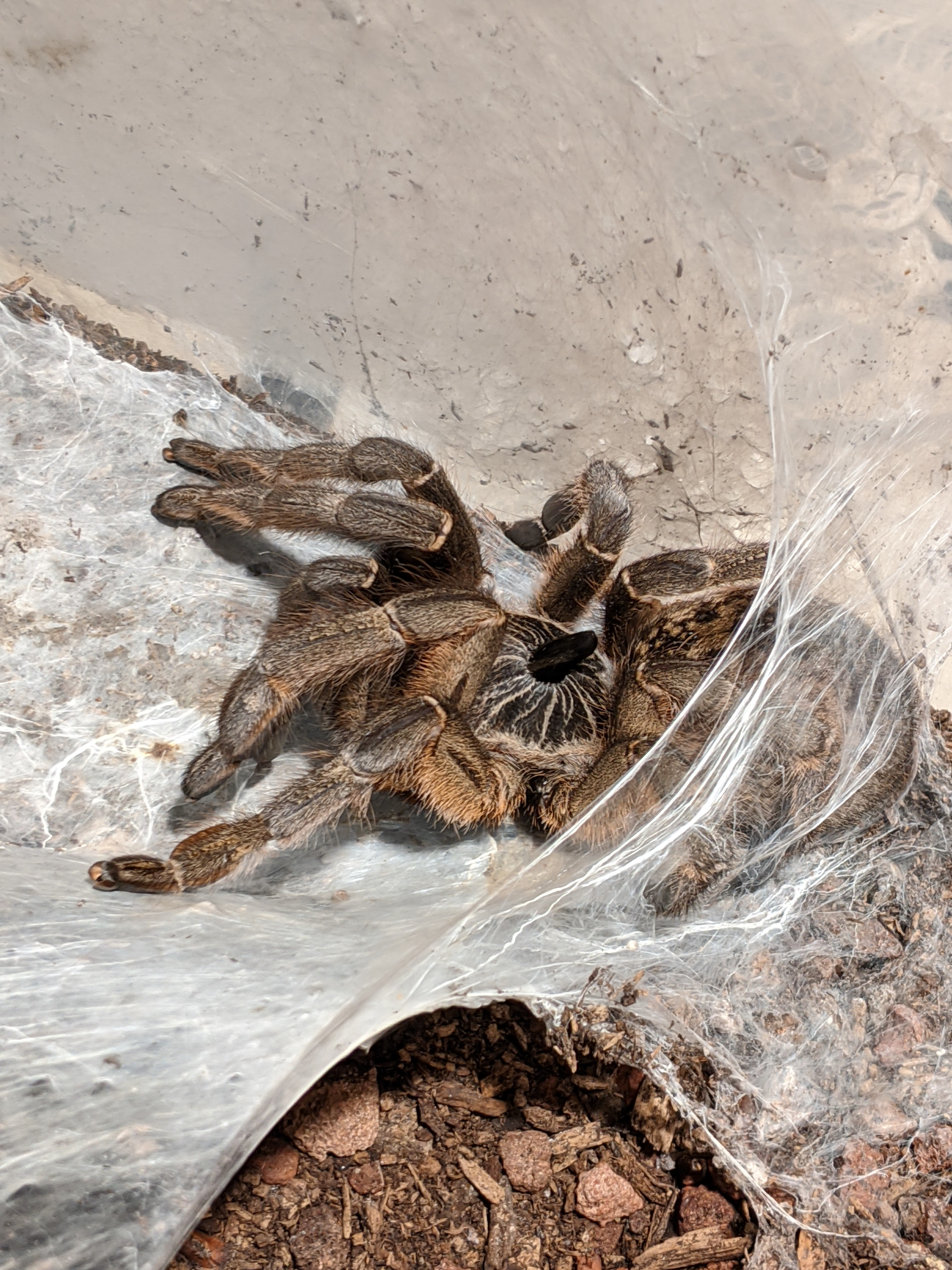
- Female Straight Horned Baboon (Ceratogyrus marshalli)

Scientific classification
- Kingdom: Animalia
- Phylum: Arthropoda
- Subphylum: Chelicerata
- Class: Arachnida
- Order: Araneae
- Infraorder: Mygalomorphae
- Family: Theraphosidae
- Genus: Ceratogyrus
- Species: C. marshalli

Binomial name
- Ceratogyrus marshalli (Pocock, 1897)

Synonyms
- Ceratogyrus dolichocephalus; Ceratogyrus cornuatus

= Ceratogyrus marshalli =

Species of tarantula

Ceratogyrus marshalli, also known as Straight Horned Baboon or Great Horned Baboon Tarantula, is a species of tarantula from the genus Ceratogyrus. It is found in Zimbabwe and Mozambique. It was first described by Reginald Innes Pocock in 1897, as half of the Ceratogyrus genus. This species is known for the impressive horn on its carapace.

== Description ==
Females live from 13 to 15 years, while males only live 3 to 4. With a body length of 6 cm and a 15 cm legspan it is a fairly large species of Ceratogyrus. Their carapace is black with some light brown striping, of course there being their namesake straight black horn. Their opisthosoma is light brown, covered in black spotting, although sometimes a fishbone pattern is apparent. Their legs are a light brown, or grey depending on visible conditions.

== Habitat ==
They can be found in Harare, Zimbabwe. This area is considered to have a subtropical highland climate. The average temperature here is 19°C, with average yearly rainfall of 805mm. Since it is located 1500m above sea level, it has surprisingly stable temperatures.

== Behavior ==
They are a very defensive spider, as is the case with most tarantulas it will first try to flee. If unable it will result in stridulation or a bite. They are burrowing and will make a vertical tunnel leading to a burrow in the end. At daytime they will most likely be in said burrow and at night will stay vigilant at the edge of her tunnel.
