= Cephalothorax =

Arthropod tagma

Bauplan of a malacostracan; the cephalothorax is the region including cephalon and thorax, marked in yellow.

The cephalothorax, also called prosoma in some groups, is a tagma of various arthropods, comprising the head and the thorax fused together, as distinct from the abdomen behind. (The terms prosoma and opisthosoma are equivalent to cephalothorax and abdomen in some groups. The terms prosoma and opisthosoma may be preferred by some researchers in cases such as arachnids, where there is neither fossil nor embryonic evidence animals in this class have ever had separate heads and thoraxes, and where the opisthosoma contains organs atypical of a true abdomen, such as a heart and respiratory organs.) The word cephalothorax is derived from the Greek words for head (κεφαλή, kephalé) and thorax (θώραξ, thórax). This fusion of the head and thorax is seen in chelicerates and crustaceans; in other groups, such as the Hexapoda (including insects), the head remains free of the thorax. An exception is females in Stylopidia, a clade in the order Strepsiptera, a group of highly specialised parasitic insects. In horseshoe crabs and many crustaceans, a hard shell called the carapace covers the cephalothorax.

== Arachnid anatomy ==
=== Fovea ===
The fovea is the centre of the cephalothorax and is located behind the head (only in spiders). It is often important in identification. It can be transverse or procurved and can, in some tarantulas (e.g. Ceratogyrus darlingi) have a "horn".

=== Clypeus ===
The clypeus is the space between the anterior of the cephalothorax and the ocularium. It is found in most arachnids. It is connected to the labrum of the invertebrate, between the labrum and the face.

=== Ocularium ===
The ocularium is a "turret" for the ocelli found in most arachnids. In harvestmen, it may have the ornament of spines.

=== Trident ===
The trident is a small group of (usually three) spines found in harvestmen exclusively. It is located in front of the ocularium. It varies in size amongst species; in some it is completely absent, and in others it is enlarged considerably.
