= Pterinochilus lugardi =

Scientific classification
- Kingdom: Animalia
- Phylum: Arthropoda
- Subphylum: Chelicerata
- Class: Arachnida
- Order: Araneae
- Infraorder: Mygalomorphae
- Family: Theraphosidae
- Genus: Pterinochilus
- Species: P. lugardi

Binomial name
- Pterinochilus lugardi Pocock, 1900

Synonyms
- Pterinochilus pluridentatus

Species of tarantula

Pterinochilus lugardi also known Grey starburst baboon, Dodoma baboon, Fort hall baboon or Tanzanian blonde baboon tarantula is a tarantula first described by Reginald Innes Pocock in 1900. They are found all over Southern and Eastern Africa, of course excluding Madagascar.

== Description ==
Females grow to around 14 cm living 12 years, and males don't pass 11 cm and live to about 4 years. Its carapace is a light brown or gray color, with some black stripes. Its opisthosoma is a pinkish light brown or tan color, with a black fishbone pattern. The legs are grey, segmented with a pinkish tan color reaching all the way to the trochanter where it becomes a darker grey.

== Behavior ==
This tarantula is burrowing, and has been seen making trapdoor, though this is rare, they are mainly seen out of their hide at night. This spider is extremely fast, and its venom is probably strong, though it is more docile and less defensive than others of its kind.
