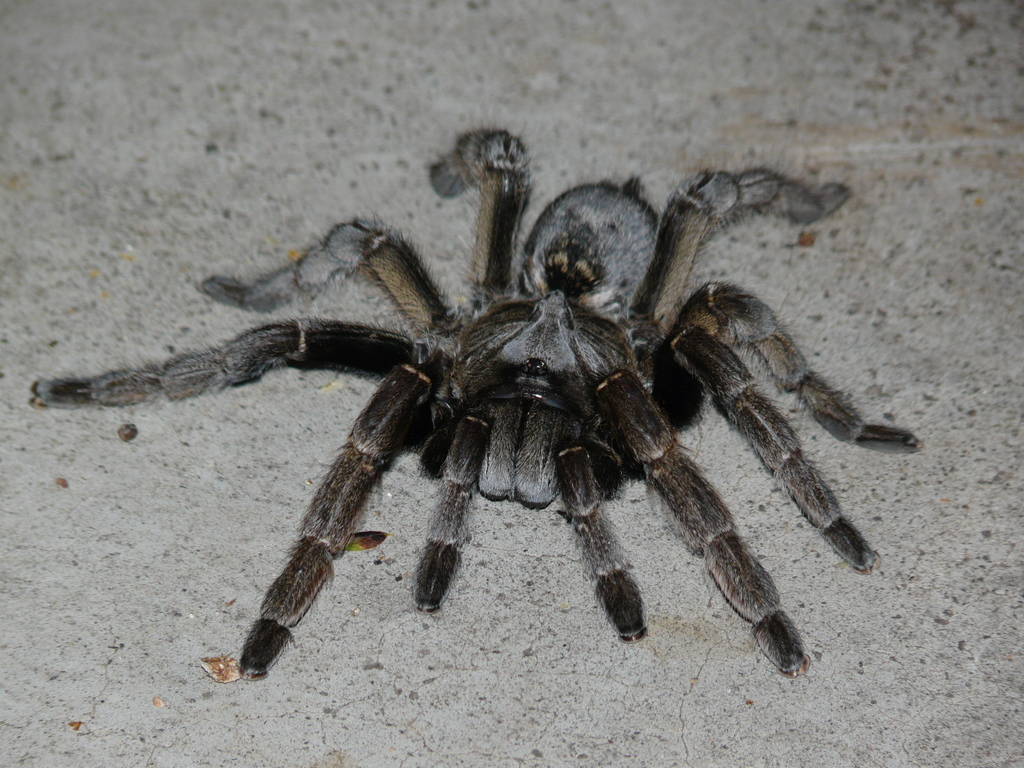

Scientific classification
- Kingdom: Animalia
- Phylum: Arthropoda
- Subphylum: Chelicerata
- Class: Arachnida
- Order: Araneae
- Infraorder: Mygalomorphae
- Clade: Avicularioidea
- Family: Theraphosidae
- Genus: Ceratogyrus
- Species: C. dolichocephalus

Binomial name
- Ceratogyrus dolichocephalus Hewitt, 1919

= Ceratogyrus dolichocephalus =

Species of tarantula

Ceratogyrus dolichocephalus is a species of tarantula. It is endemic to Zimbabwe.
