= Ceratogyrus brachycephalus =

Greater horned baboon

Scientific classification
- Kingdom: Animalia
- Phylum: Arthropoda
- Subphylum: Chelicerata
- Class: Arachnida
- Order: Araneae
- Infraorder: Mygalomorphae
- Family: Theraphosidae
- Genus: Ceratogyrus
- Species: C. brachycephalus

Binomial name
- Ceratogyrus brachycephalus Hewitt, 1919

Species of spider

Ceratogyrus brachycephalus (greater horned baboon tarantula) is an old world terrestrial tarantula that grows to a legspan of up to 5 inches (12 cm). The common name comes from the "horn", or protuberance, on the carapace.

== Distribution ==
C. brachycephalus is found in Botswana, Zimbabwe and South Africa.

== Pet tarantula ==
Ceratogyrus brachycephalus is a relatively common tarantula for hobbyists to keep. It prefers to burrow, but in the absence of substrate to burrow it will web and make web "tunnels". This species is extremely fast and aggressive; care must be taken when performing tank upkeep. Some people surmise that what is commonly called C. brachycephalus in the pet trade might actually be Ceratogyrus sanderi, or maybe a hybrid.
