= Augacephalus ezendami =

Scientific classification
- Kingdom: Animalia
- Phylum: Arthropoda
- Subphylum: Chelicerata
- Class: Arachnida
- Order: Araneae
- Infraorder: Mygalomorphae
- Family: Theraphosidae
- Genus: Augacephalus
- Species: A. ezendami

Binomial name
- Augacephalus ezendami Gallon, 2001

Species of tarantula

Augacephalus ezendami is a tarantula found in Mozambique, it was first described by Richard C. Gallon in 2001. It is named after Thomas Ezendam, whom provided Gallon with numerous specimens.

== Description ==
A. ezendami has a black carapace, with golden striping. Its femur is golden, while the opisthosoma and legs are creamy or tan, with a black fishbone pattern.

== Habitat ==
They are found in the tropical savannas of Mozambique.

== Behavior ==
As a defensive tarantula, A. ezendami is are obligate burrower, which means it will usually stay in the entrance of its burrow and wait for prey. It is also a quite prolific webber, making webs if there is no are available places to burrow.
