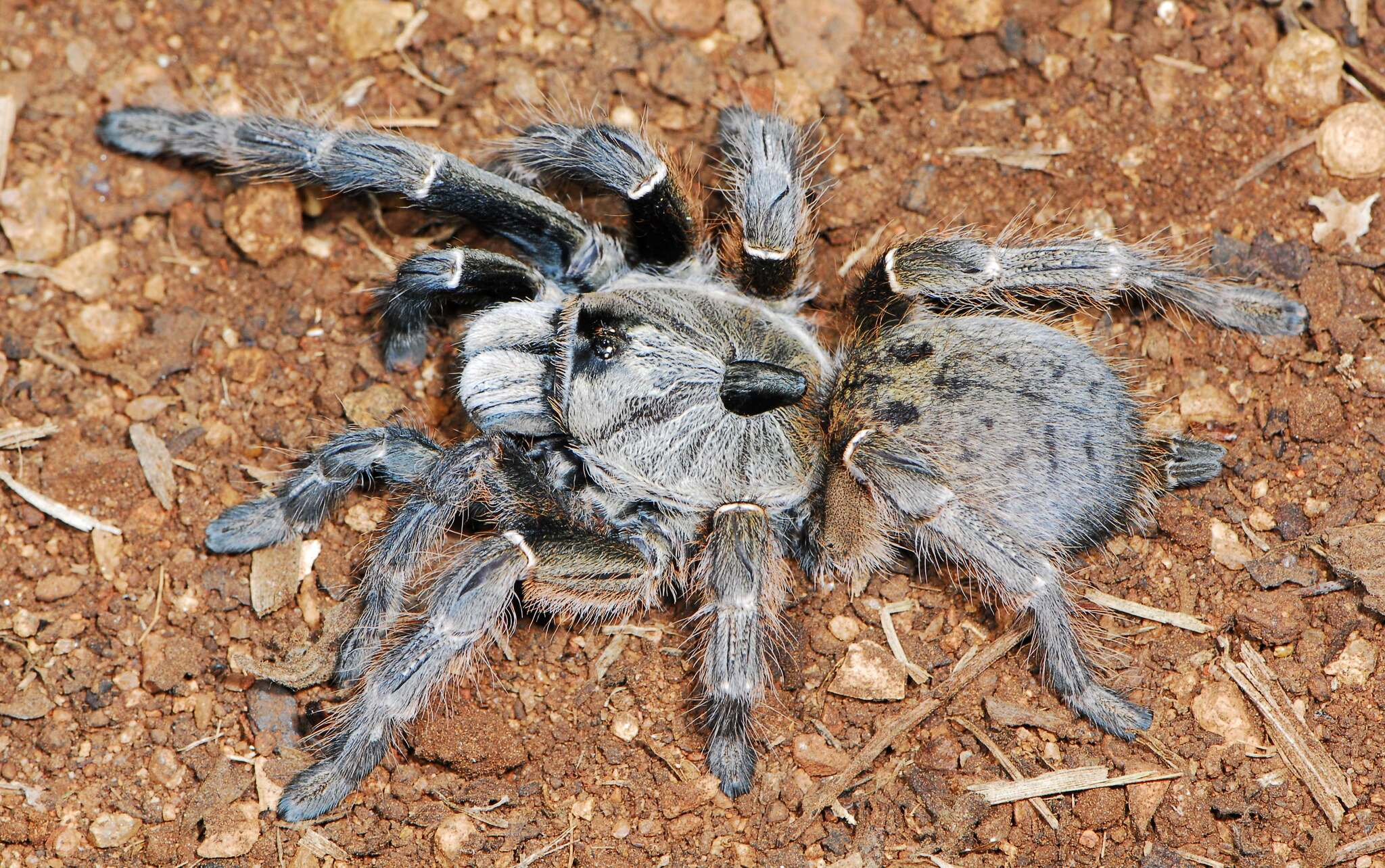
- Adult female
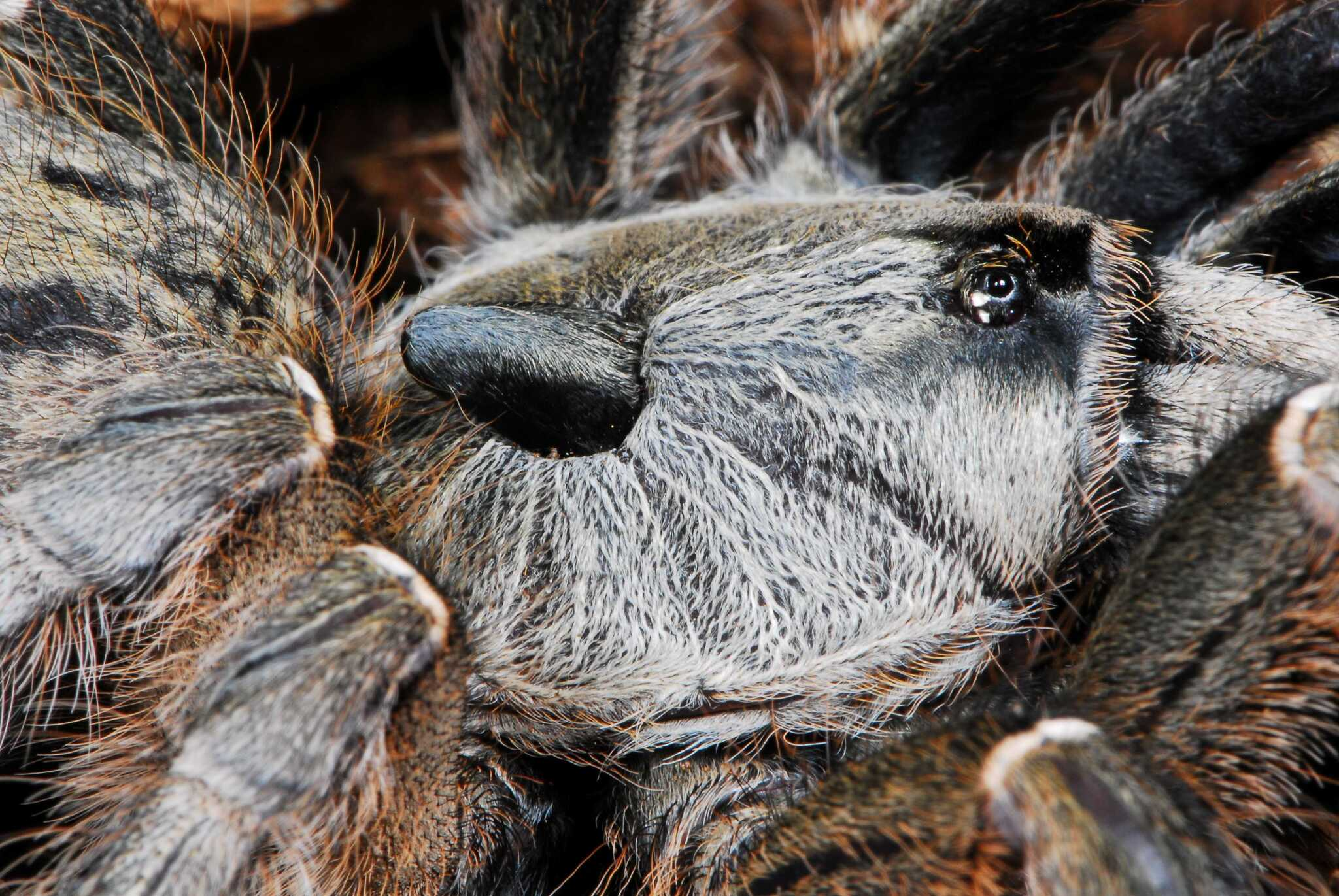

Scientific classification
- Kingdom: Animalia
- Phylum: Arthropoda
- Subphylum: Chelicerata
- Class: Arachnida
- Order: Araneae
- Infraorder: Mygalomorphae
- Family: Theraphosidae
- Genus: Ceratogyrus
- Species: C. darlingi

Binomial name
- Ceratogyrus darlingi Pocock, 1897

Synonyms
- Ceratogyrus darlingii Pocock, 1897; Ceratogyrus bechuanicus Purcell, 1902; Ceratogyrus schultzei Purcell, 1908; Ceratogyrus dolichocephalus Smith, 1990

= Ceratogyrus darlingi =

Burst horned baboon tarantula

Species of spider

Ceratogyrus darlingi (commonly called burst horned baboon tarantula or African rear-horned baboon tarantula, synonym Ceratogyrus bechuanicus) is a theraphosid spider from southern Africa, mainly Botswana and Lesotho. They reach a body length of about 5 inches (130 mm) and are ash-gray, mud-brown to black. The peltidium features a black foveal horn.

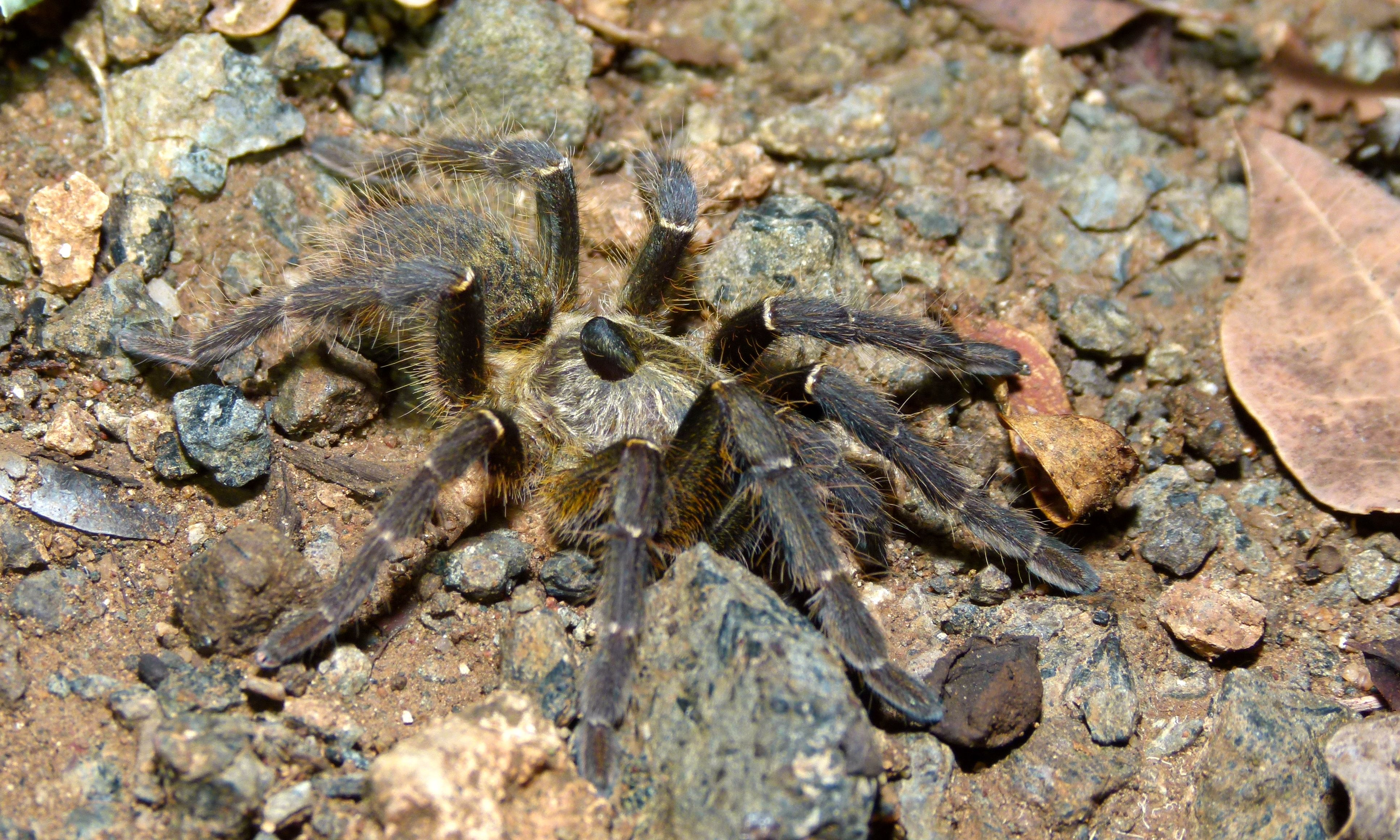
Juvenile

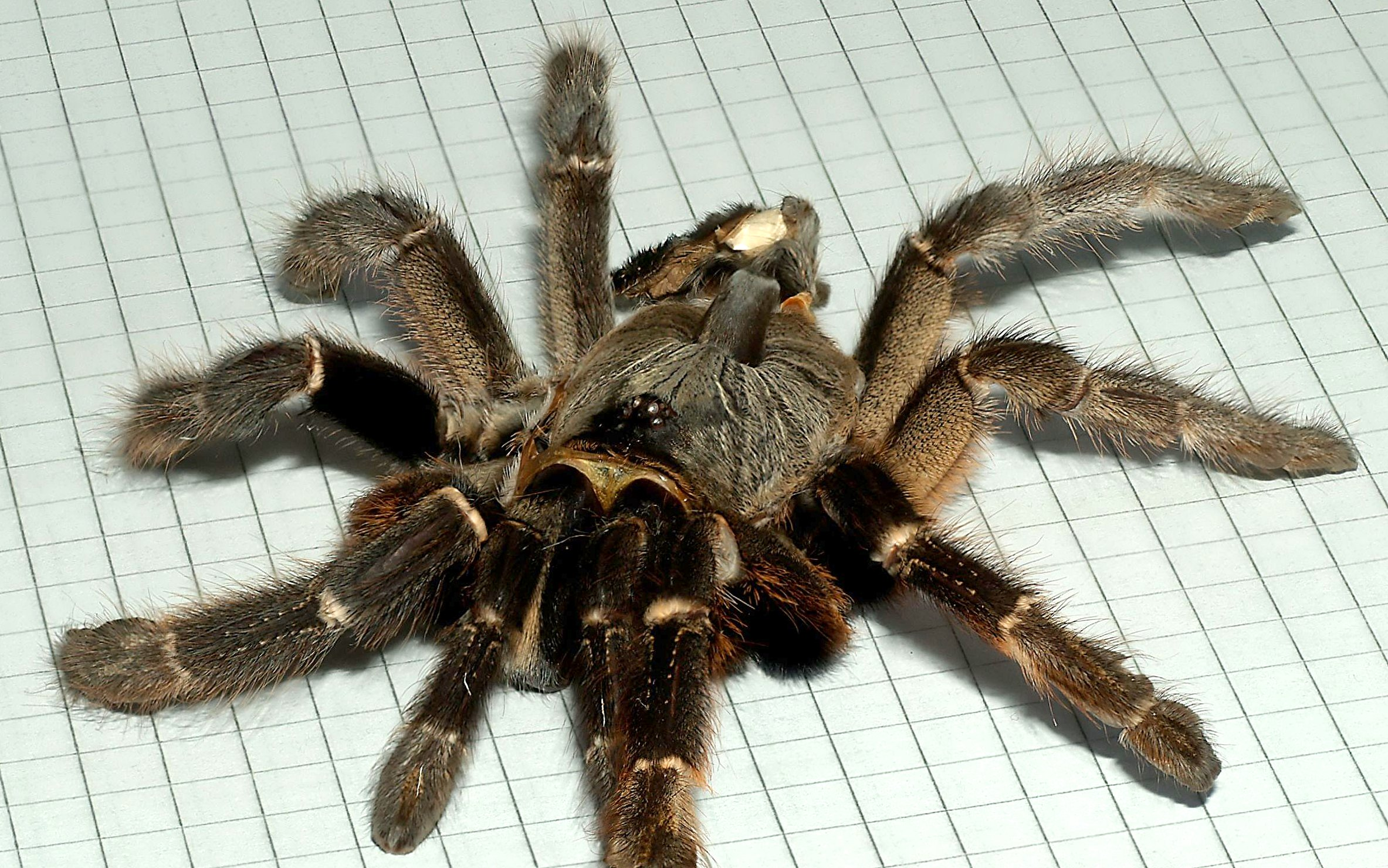
Exuvia of adult female

== As pets ==
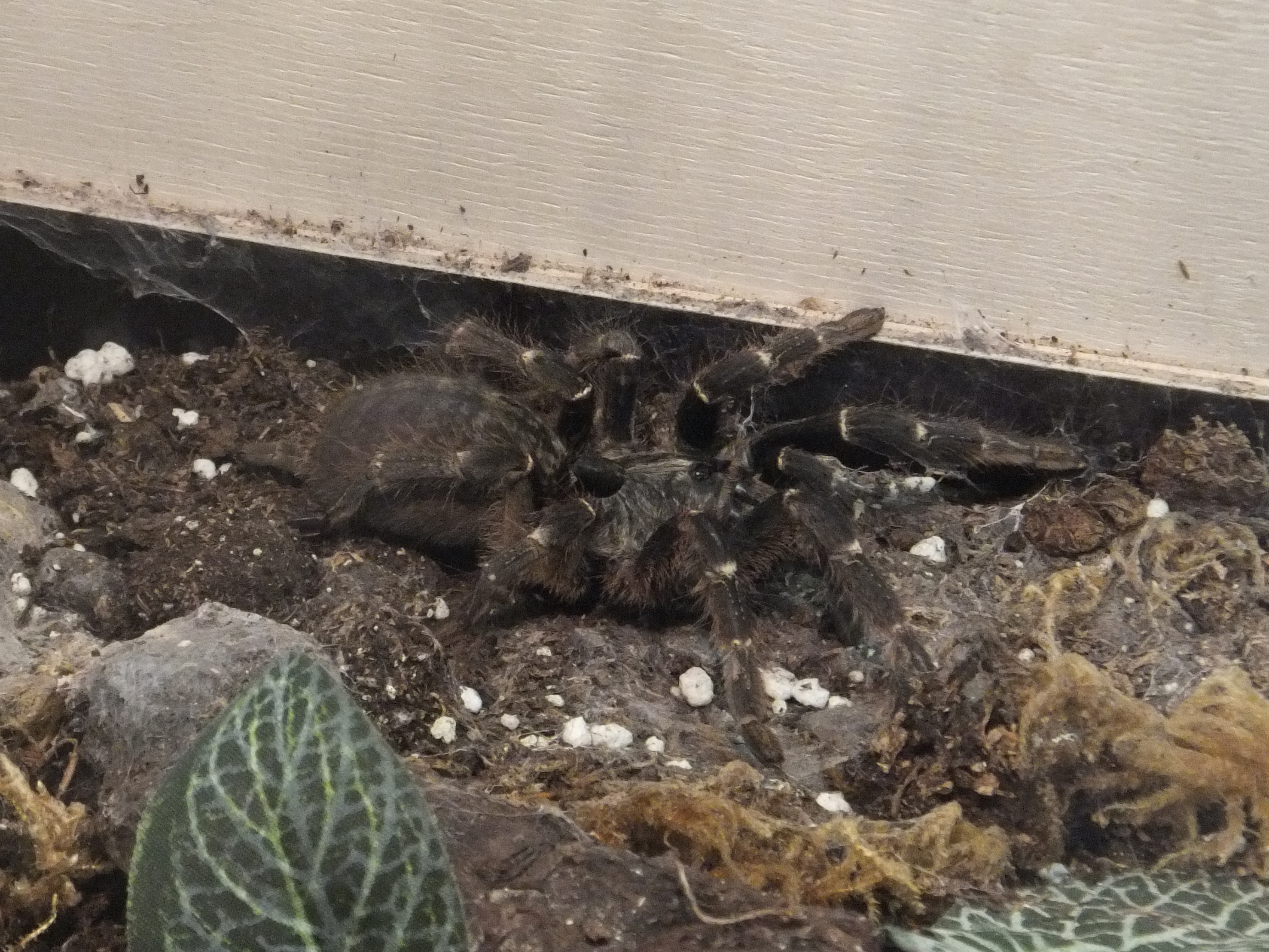

C. darlingi, often still known under its obsolete name C. bechuanicus, is the most common Ceratogyrus species held in captivity, although it is very defensive and fast. When kept in captivity, it requires dry substrate, such as coconut fiber, on which to live. This allows it to burrow, as they are obligate burrowers. As this species is from a very arid habitat, it cannot cope with too much moisture.

They will readily take crickets, roaches, and superworms but tend to shy away from large prey items. Food is usually pulled in and eaten inside the burrow. Molting also occurs inside the burrow.

Pairs will breed readily and quickly. Females could live an approximate 10 to 15 years in captivity.
