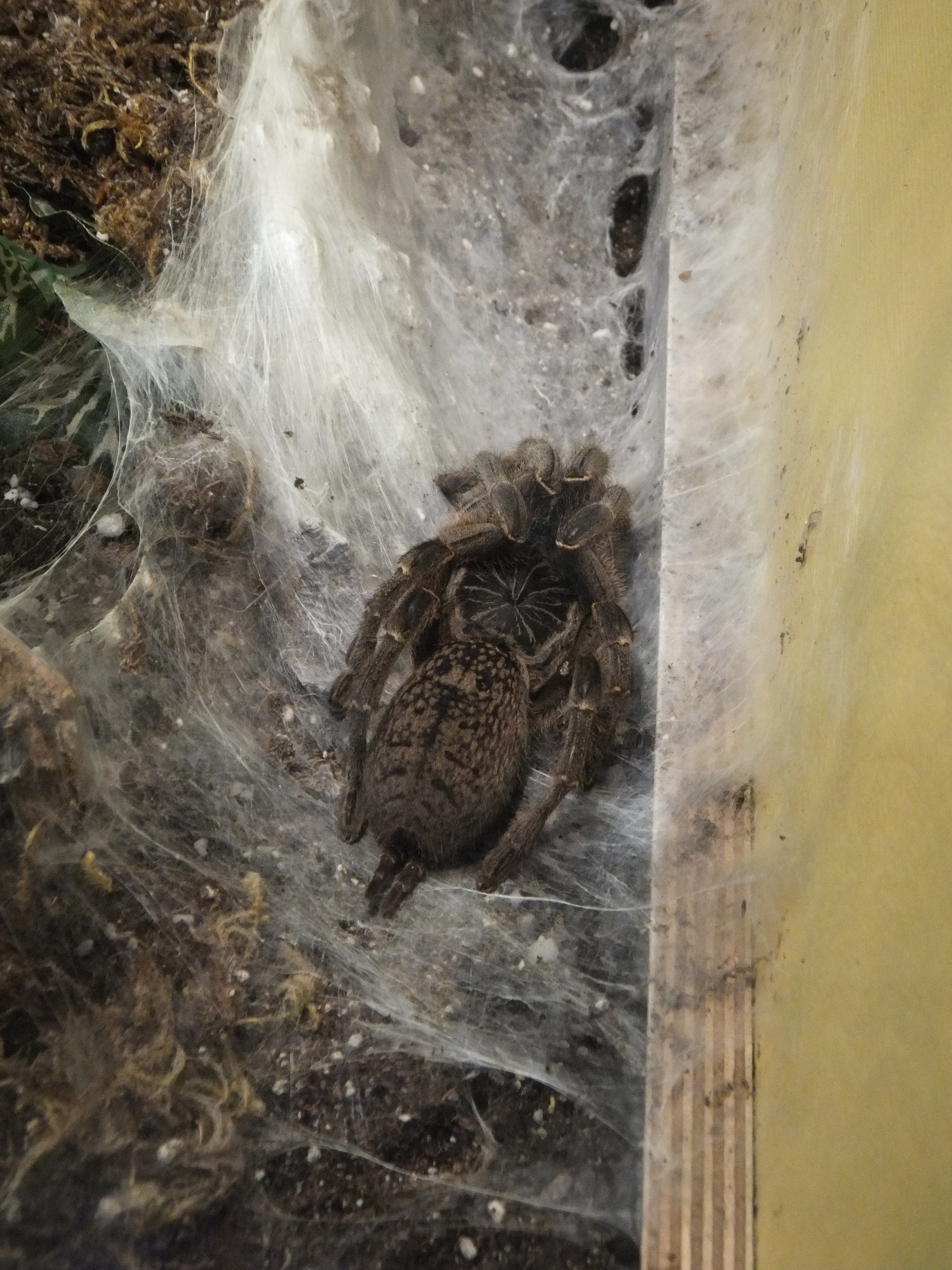

Scientific classification
- Kingdom: Animalia
- Phylum: Arthropoda
- Subphylum: Chelicerata
- Class: Arachnida
- Order: Araneae
- Infraorder: Mygalomorphae
- Clade: Avicularioidea
- Family: Theraphosidae
- Genus: Ceratogyrus
- Species: C. meridionalis

Binomial name
- Ceratogyrus meridionalis (Hirst, 1907)

= Ceratogyrus meridionalis =

Species of tarantula

Ceratogyrus meridionalis, commonly known as the Zimbabwe grey baboon tarantula or the grey mustard baboon, is a species of tarantula. It is found in Malawi and Mozambique.
