= Trichognathella =

Scientific classification
- Kingdom: Animalia
- Phylum: Arthropoda
- Subphylum: Chelicerata
- Class: Arachnida
- Order: Araneae
- Infraorder: Mygalomorphae
- Family: Theraphosidae
- Genus: Trichognathella; Gallon, 2004
- Species: T. schoenlandi

Binomial name
- Trichognathella schoenlandi (Pocock, 1900)

Genus of spiders

Trichognathella is a monotypic genus of South African tarantulas containing the single species, Trichognathella schoenlandi. It was first described by R. C. Gallon in 2004, and is endemic to South Africa.
