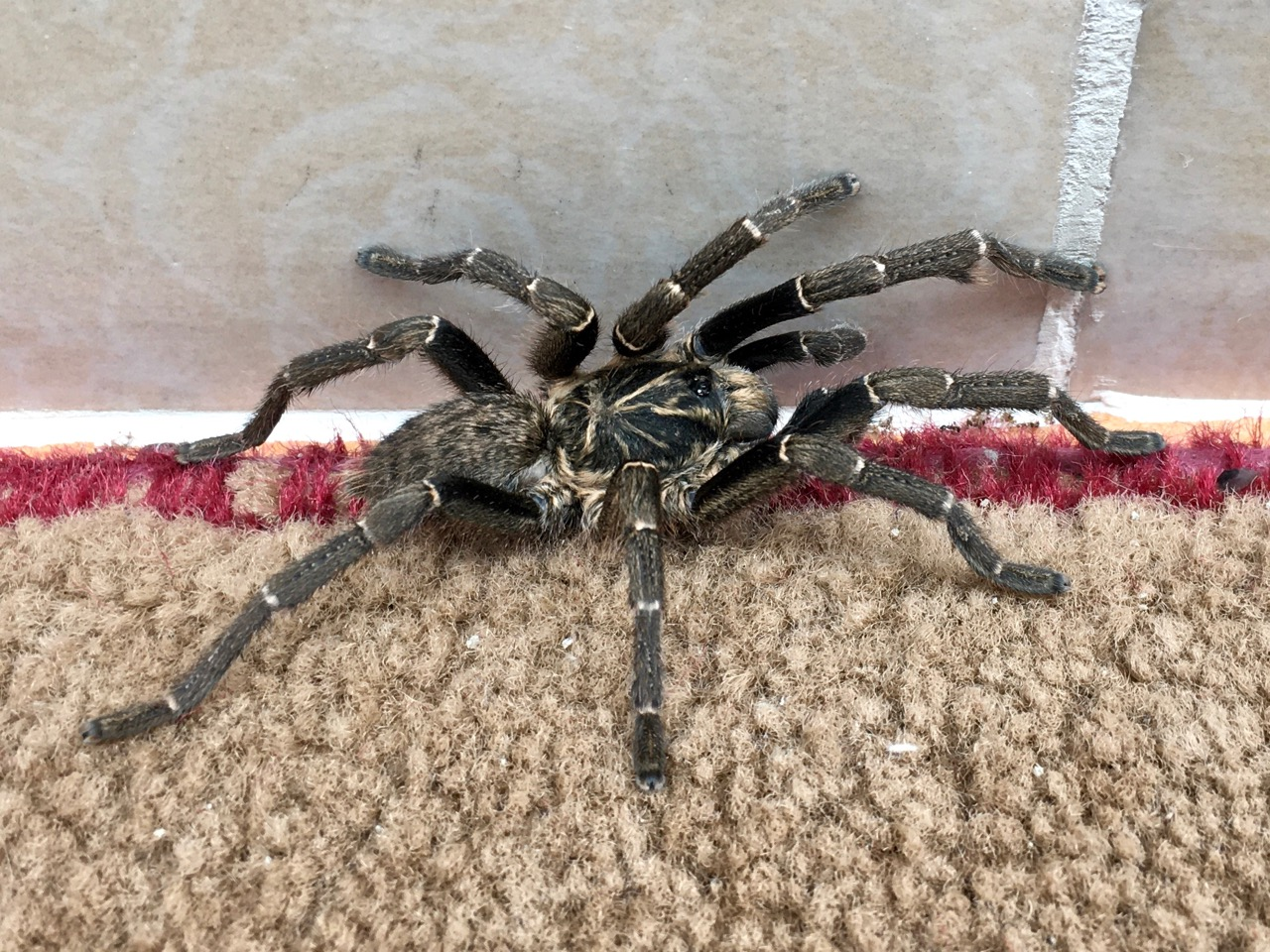
- Pterinochilus chordatus near Mt. Kenya

Scientific classification
- Kingdom: Animalia
- Phylum: Arthropoda
- Subphylum: Chelicerata
- Class: Arachnida
- Order: Araneae
- Infraorder: Mygalomorphae
- Family: Theraphosidae
- Genus: Pterinochilus
- Species: P. chordatus

Binomial name
- Pterinochilus chordatus Gerstäcker, 1873

= Pterinochilus chordatus =

Species of spider

Pterinochilus chordatus, or Kilimanjaro mustard baboon spider, is an old-world tarantula, first described in 1873 by Carl Eduard Adolph Gerstaecker. This species is found on the East side of the African continent, from South Kordofan in Sudan in the north, to Tanzania in the south. It has a body length of up to 2 inches (5 cm) and a leg span of up to 6 inches (15 cm).

Like most old world tarantulas, the Kilimanjaro mustard baboon can be fairly aggressive. It is not a recommended pet for beginners.
