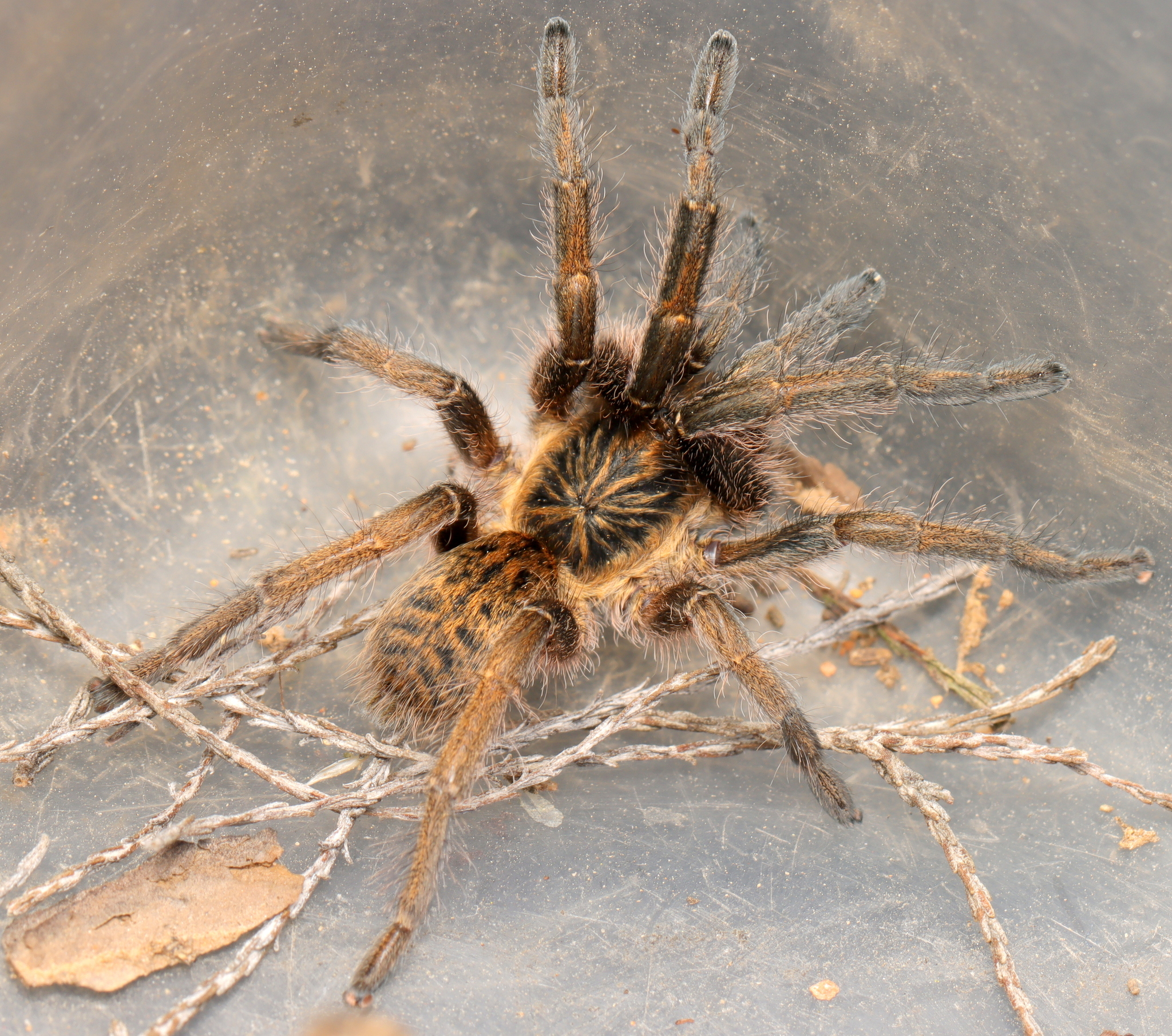
- H. lightfooti
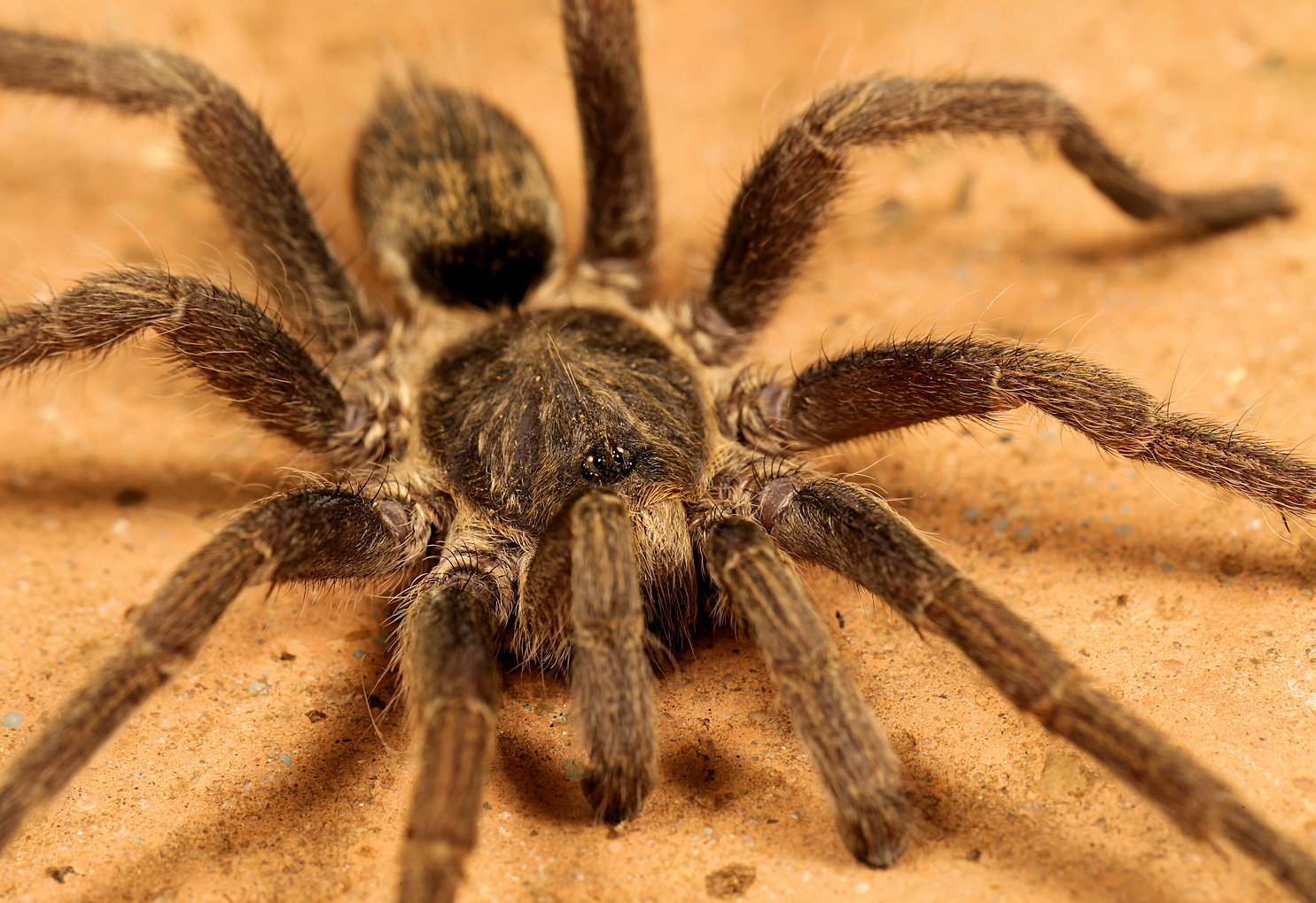
- H. overdijki

Scientific classification
- Kingdom: Animalia
- Phylum: Arthropoda
- Subphylum: Chelicerata
- Class: Arachnida
- Order: Araneae
- Infraorder: Mygalomorphae
- Family: Theraphosidae
- Genus: Harpactirella; Purcell, 1902

Type species
- H. treleaveni Purcell, 1902

Species
- 11, see text

Synonyms
- Luphocemus Denis, 1960

= Harpactirella =

Genus of spiders

Harpactirella is a genus of South African tarantulas that was first described by William Frederick Purcell in 1902. Originally placed with the brushed trapdoor spiders, it was transferred to the tarantulas in 1985.

It is considered a senior synonym of Luphocemus.

All of its described species are endemic to South Africa.

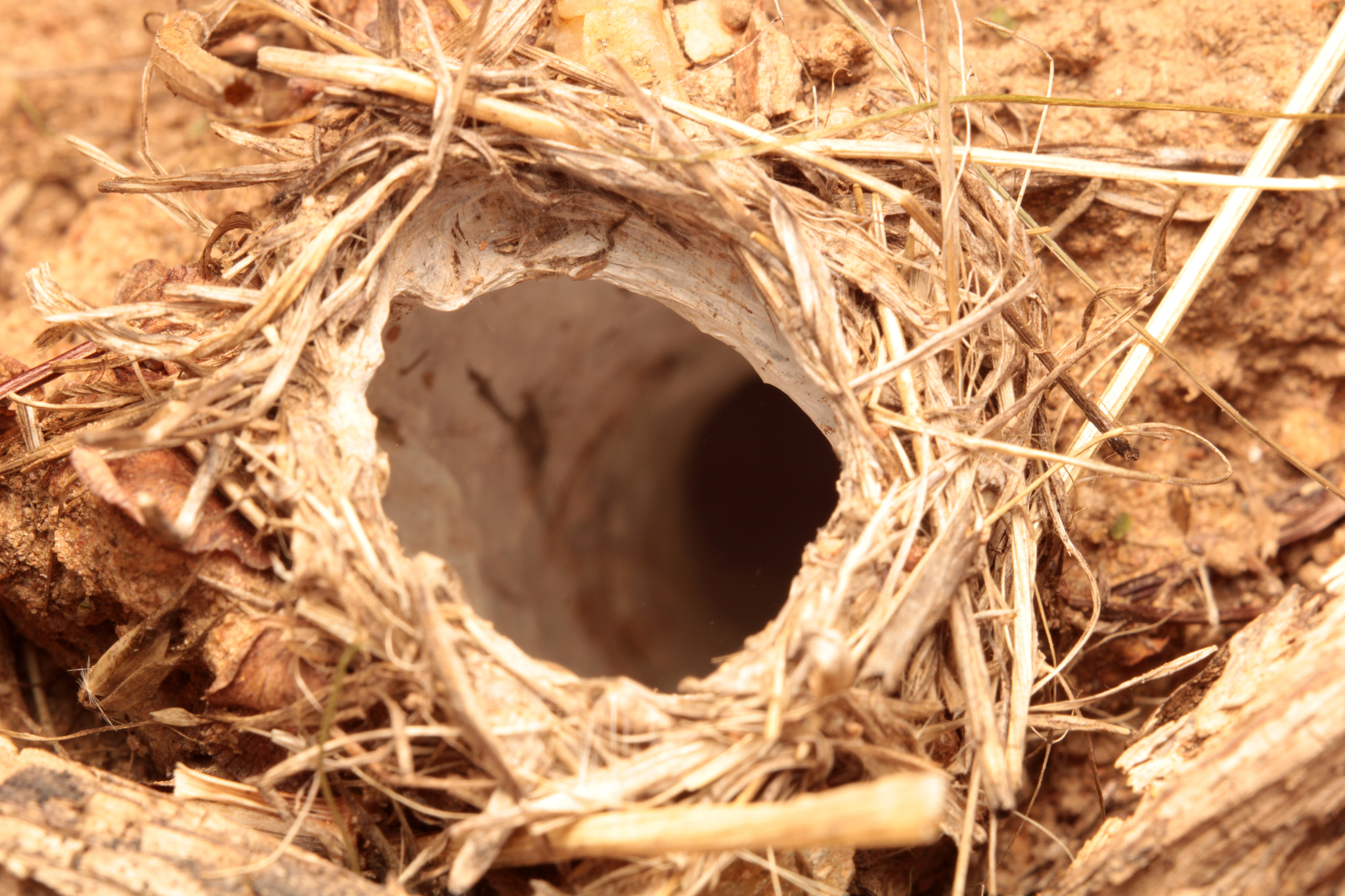
H. lightfooti burrow

== Species ==
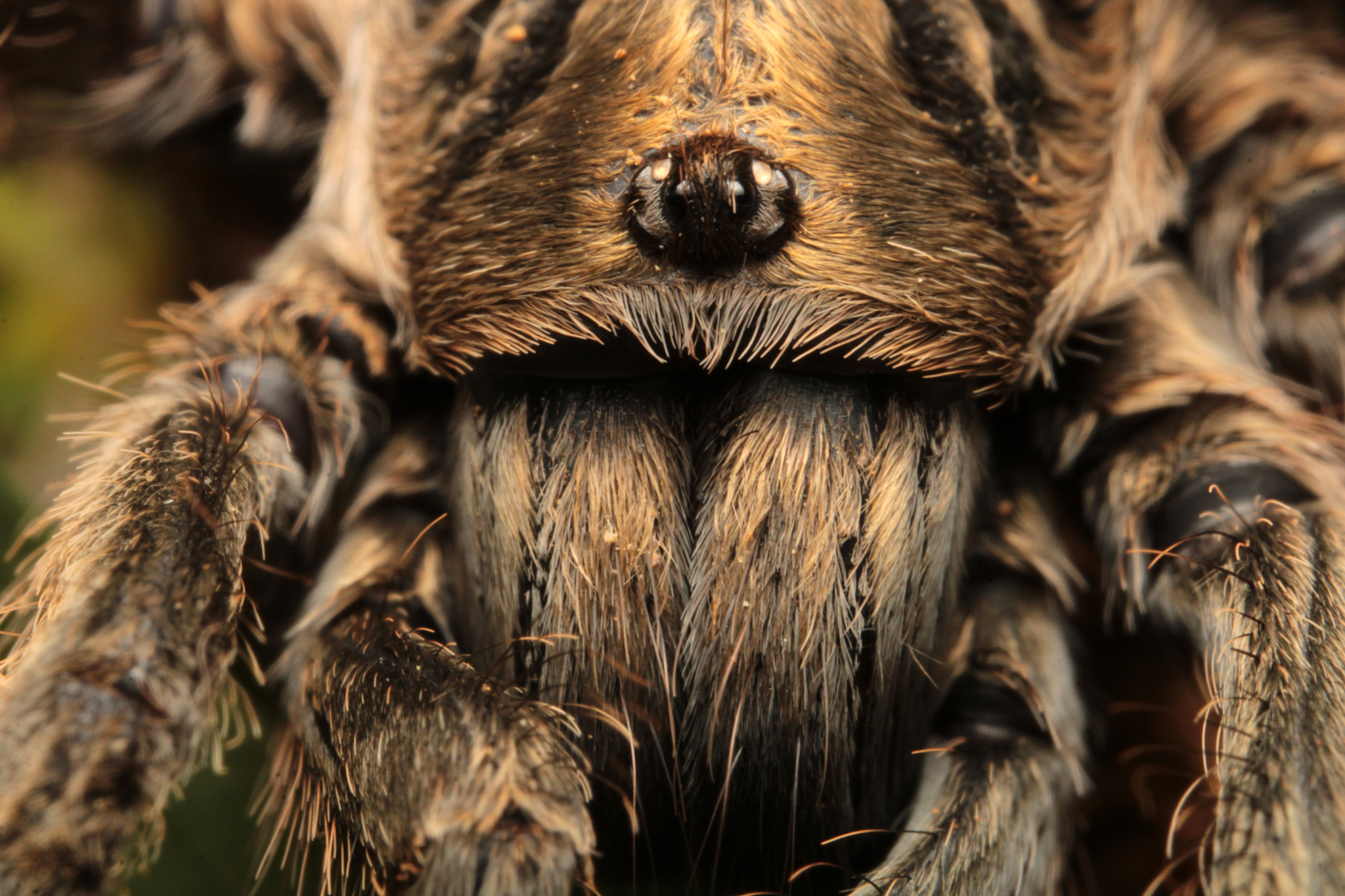
H. lightfooti

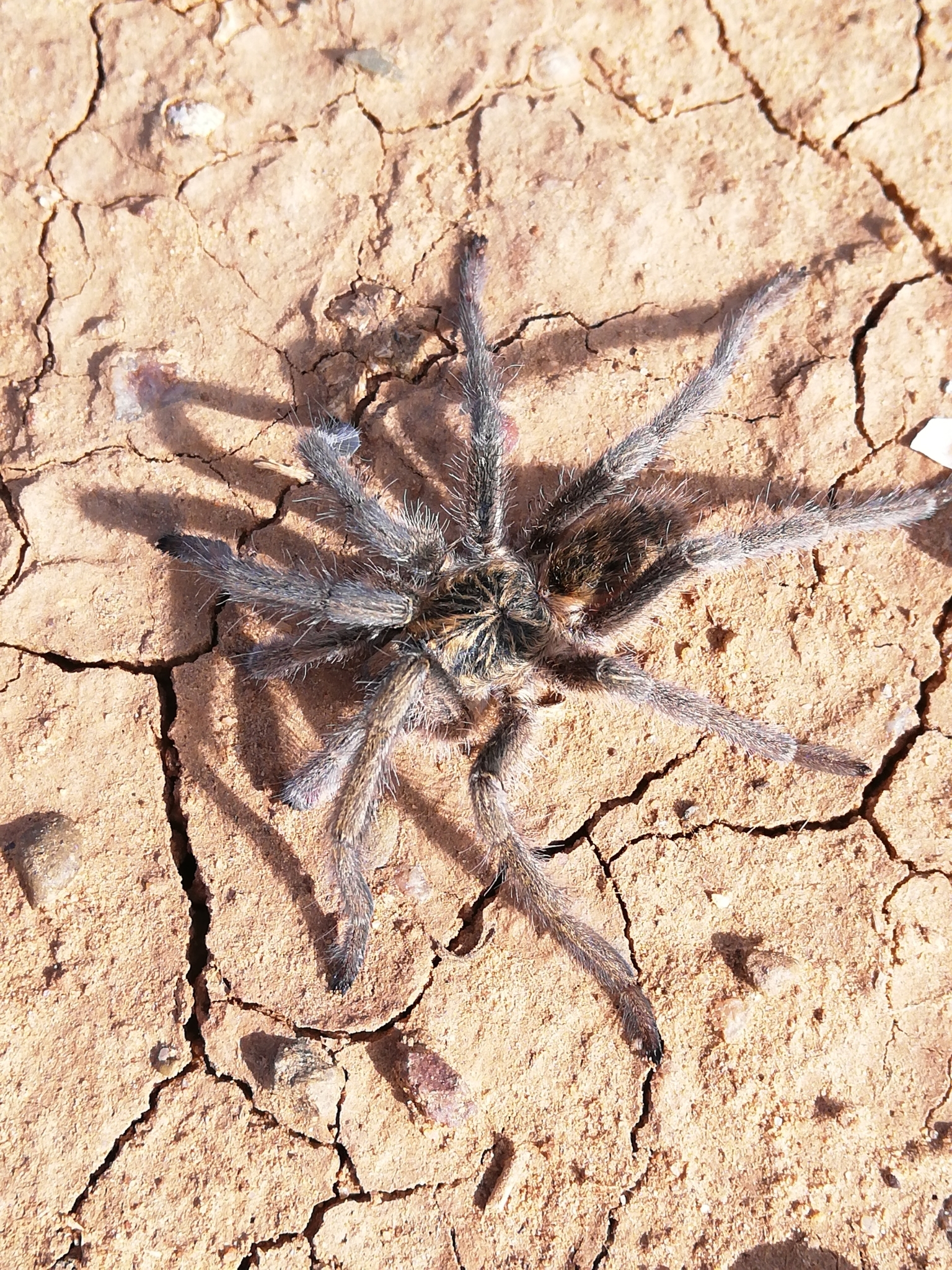
H. magna

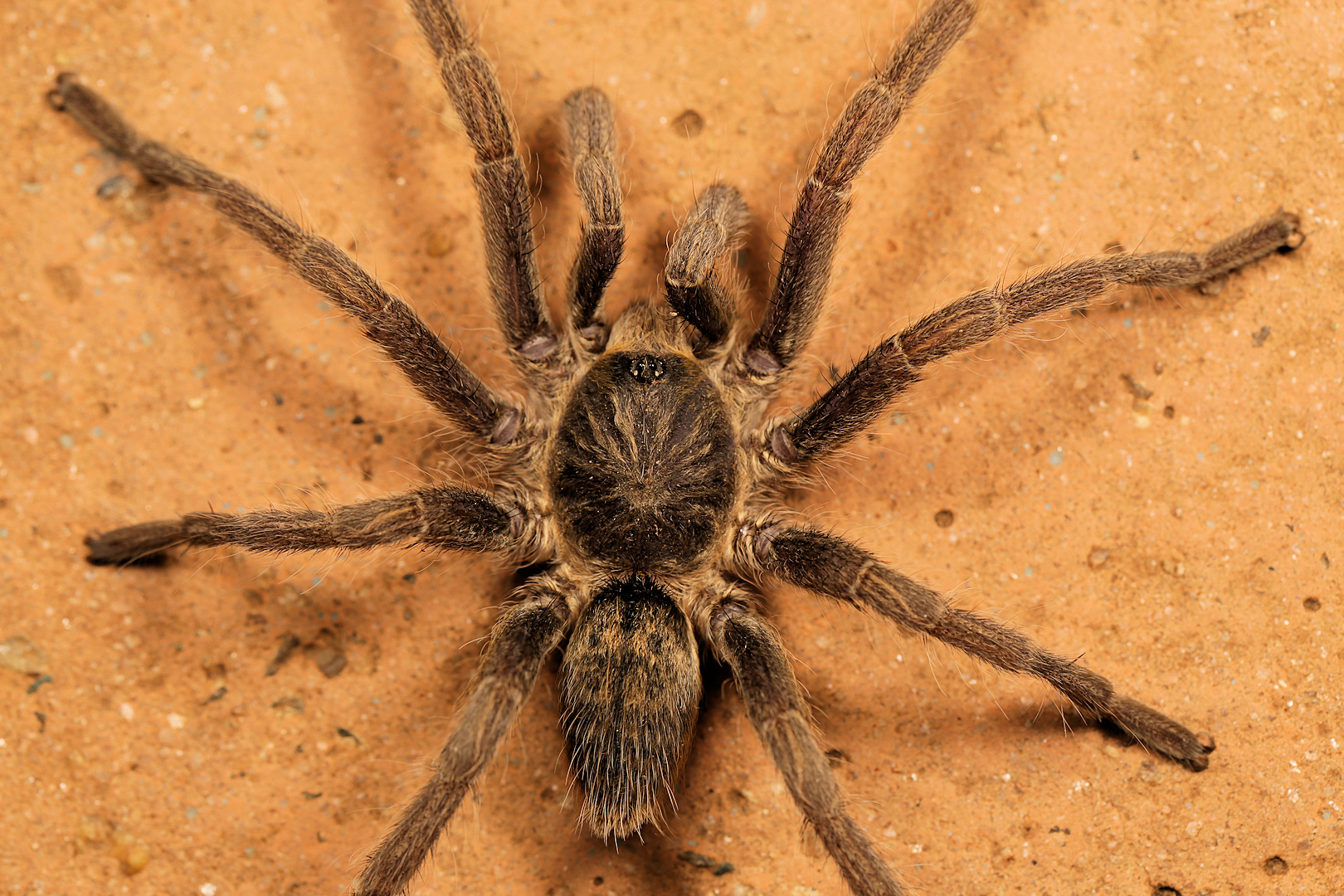
H. overdijki

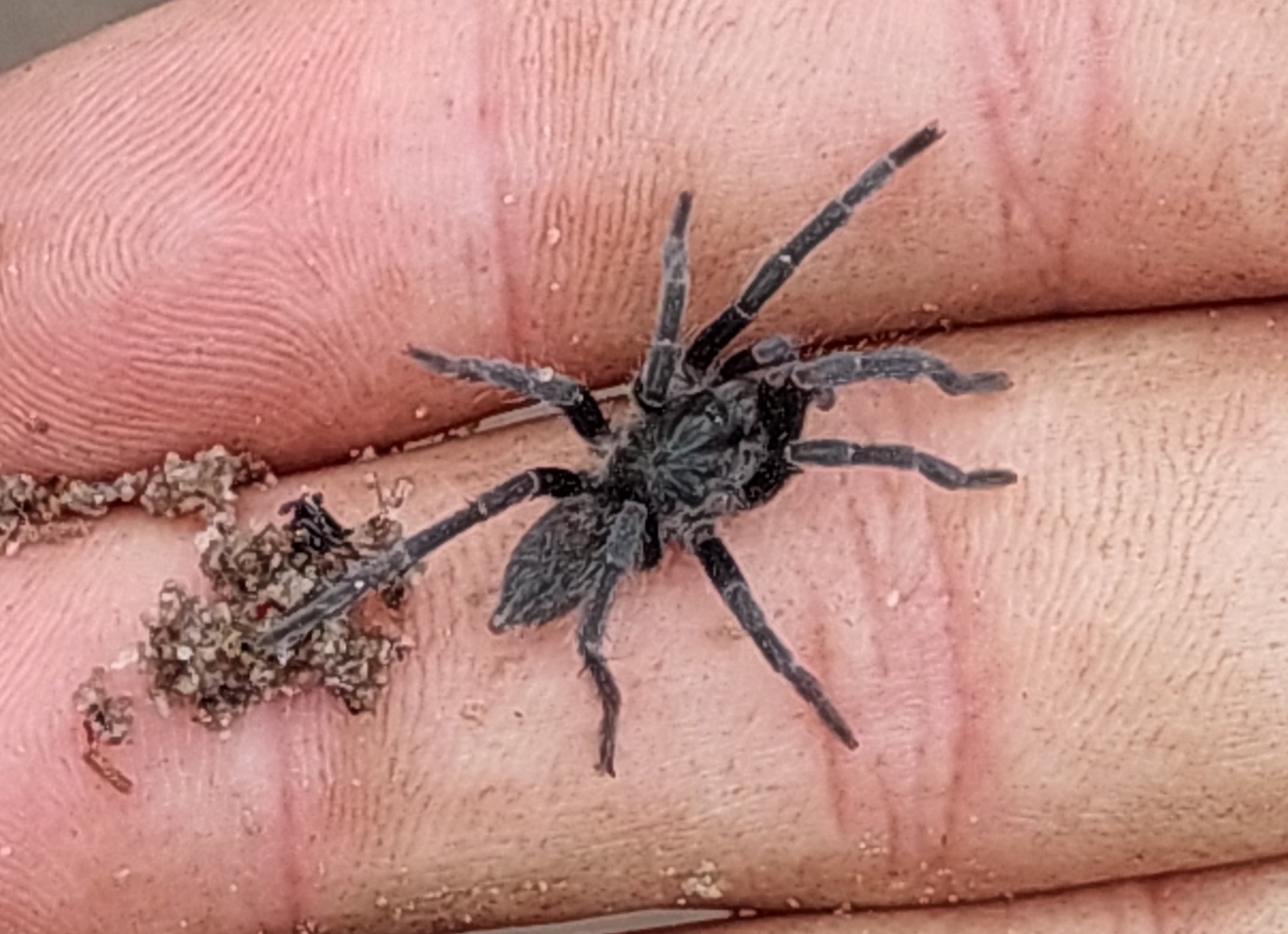
adult male H. treleaveni

As of October 2025, this genus includes eleven species:

- Harpactirella domicola Purcell, 1903
- Harpactirella helenae Purcell, 1903
- Harpactirella karrooica Purcell, 1902
- Harpactirella lapidaria Purcell, 1908
- Harpactirella lightfooti Purcell, 1902
- Harpactirella longipes Purcell, 1902
- Harpactirella magna Purcell, 1903
- Harpactirella overdijki Gallon, 2010
- Harpactirella schwarzi Purcell, 1904
- Harpactirella spinosa Purcell, 1908
- Harpactirella treleaveni Purcell, 1902 (type species)
