= Göhrde State Forest =

Largest mixed forest in North Germany

Coordinates: 53°06′43″N 10°49′52″E

The Göhrde State Forest (German: Staatsforst Göhrde) is the largest contiguous mixed forest region in North Germany. It lies in the districts of Lüchow-Dannenberg and Lüneburg.

== Description ==
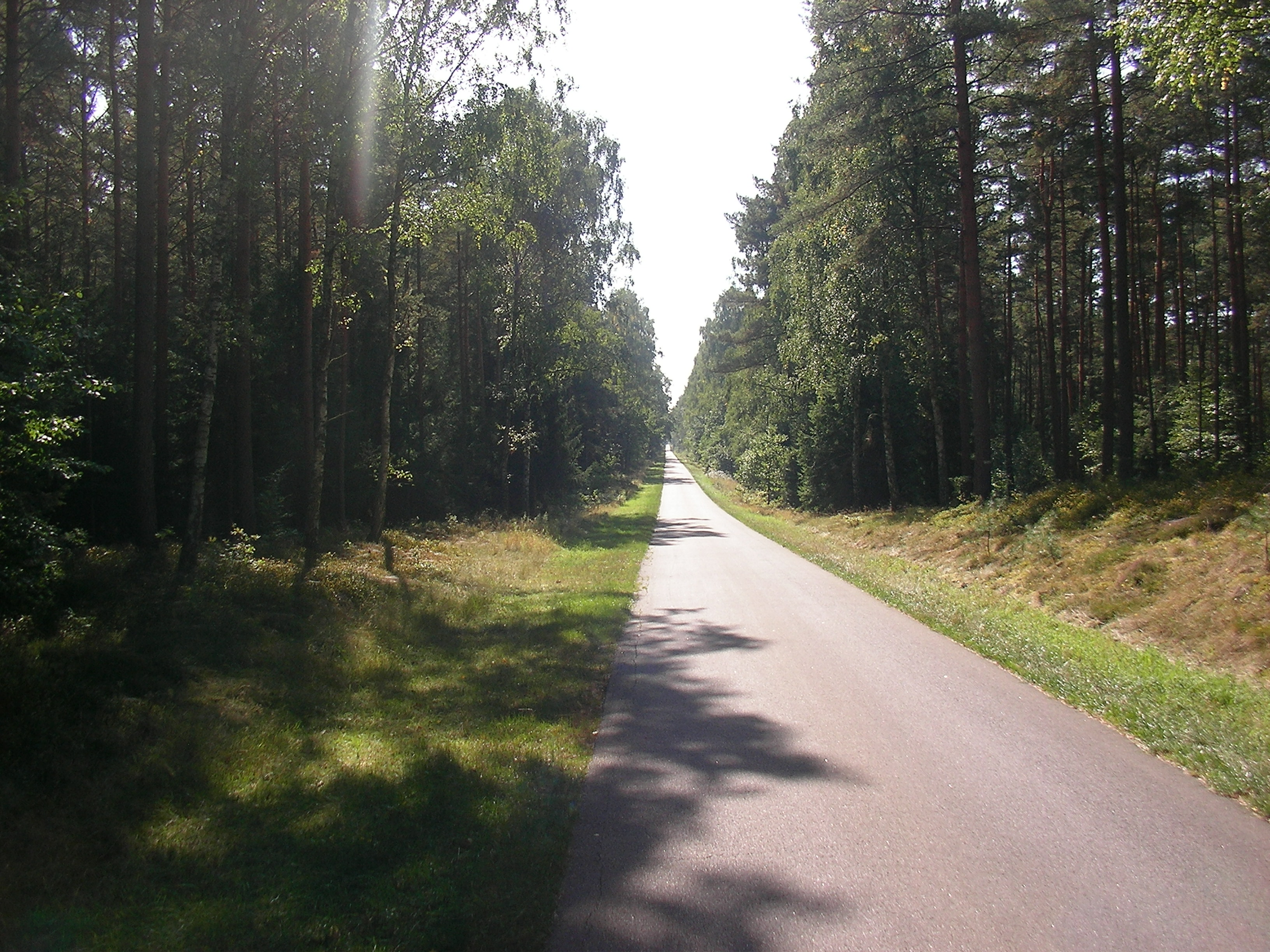
The state forest near the village of Röthen

The Göhrde includes the entire unincorporated area of Göhrde, parts of the municipality of Göhrde (both in Lüchow-Dannenberg district) as well as parts of the municipalities of Nahrendorf and Boitze (Lüneburg district). The forest is also part of the Elbufer-Drawehn Nature Park and is located on a plateau with an average height of 80 metres above NN (roughly from 50 to 110 m NN) in the northwestern area of the Drawehn. Because the Göhrde region has no rivers it was never settled.

The state forest of Göhrde is about 75 km² in area and at its heart has some very old stands of trees. Many of these giant trees (especially English Oaks) have been designated as natural monuments and are protected. The main species of tree in the woods, which lie on the mostly sandy soils and rolling terrain, are the Scots Pine, Common Beech, Spruce and Oak. The long-stemmed oaks are important for silviculture and belong to the most profitable in Germany, due to their closely spaced annual rings, that are produced by the warm, sunny climate and low levels of rainfall. In the Breeser Grund (Breese Bottom) in the south of the Göhrde a Hutewald of some 37 hectares (91 acres) has been preserved with old isolated oaks and heath landscapes.

Fallow Deer, Red Deer and Mouflon live in the forest.

The Breeser Grund is an EU Special Area of Conservation which is especially worth protecting as are the beech woods in the Göhrde (Buchenwälder in der Göhrde) southeast of the village of Göhrde itself.

== History ==
The Göhrde was once a favourite hunting ground of the Dukes of Brunswick-Lüneburg. Later the Kings of Hannover also hunted here and – to 1918 – the German emperors. The buildings of the old Göhrde Hunting Lodge still stand in the village of Göhrde in the heart of the state forest. The castle itself was demolished in 1827. The remaining buildings house the Göhrde Training Centre (Bildungszentrum Göhrde). In September 1813 the Battle of the Göhrde was fought there.

On the northern edge of the forest in the village of Breese am Seißelberge is Göhrde station, on the Wendland Railway, which was named after the forest. Because the emperors of Germany used to alight at this station as they travelled to their hunts in the forest it was also locally known as the Kaiserbahnhof (Emperor Station).

== Literature ==
- Ernst Andreas Friedrich: Naturdenkmale Niedersachsens. Hannover, 1980. ISBN 3-7842-0227-6
