= Kaiserbahnhof =

Kaiserbahnhof (Kaiser's station) refers to some private railway stations of Germany and Austria used by the Kaisers. Nowadays they are historical buildings that are part of their related modern stations.

Kaiserbahnhof may refer to the following places in Germany:

- Kaiserbahnhof Bad Homburg, Bad Homburg station, Hesse
- Kaiserbahnhof Göhrde, Göhrde station, Lower Saxony
- Kaiserbahnhof Halbe, Halbe Bahnhof, Halbe, Brandenburg on the Berlin–Görlitz railway
- Joachimsthal Kaiserbahnhof, Joachimstal, Brandenburg
- Kaiserbahnhof Kierberg, Kierberg station, North Rhine-Westphalia
- Kaiserbahnhof Niedermendig, Mendig station, Rhineland-Palatinate
- Kaiserbahnhof Potsdam, Potsdam Park Sanssouci station, Brandenburg

Kaiserbahnhof may refer to the following place in Russia:

- Kaiserbahnhof Groß Rominten (East Prussia), today Krasnolesye
