= Göhrde (unincorporated area) =

- Unincorporated area
- Location of Göhrde within Lüchow-Dannenberg district
- Interactive map of Göhrde
- Location within Germany Location within Lower Saxony
- Coordinates: 53°7′N 10°49′E
- Country: Germany
- State: Lower Saxony
- District: Lüchow-Dannenberg

Area
  - Total: 51.92 km^{2} (20.05 sq mi)

Population (2025-12-31)
  - Total: 0
  - Density: 0.0/km^{2} (0.0/sq mi)
- Time zone: UTC+01:00 (CET)
  - Summer (DST): UTC+02:00 (CEST)

Göhrde is an unincorporated area in the German district of Lüchow-Dannenberg, 51.92 km^{2} (20.05 sq mi) in size. It contains large parts of the Göhrde State Forest and is unpopulated - the villages of Kollase, Röthen and Zienitz are exclaves of the bordering municipality of Göhrde, not the unincorporated area. It is also bordered by Zernien, as well as the districts of Lüneburg and Uelzen.
