= Göhrde station =

Railway station in Nahrendorf, Germany

Göhrde
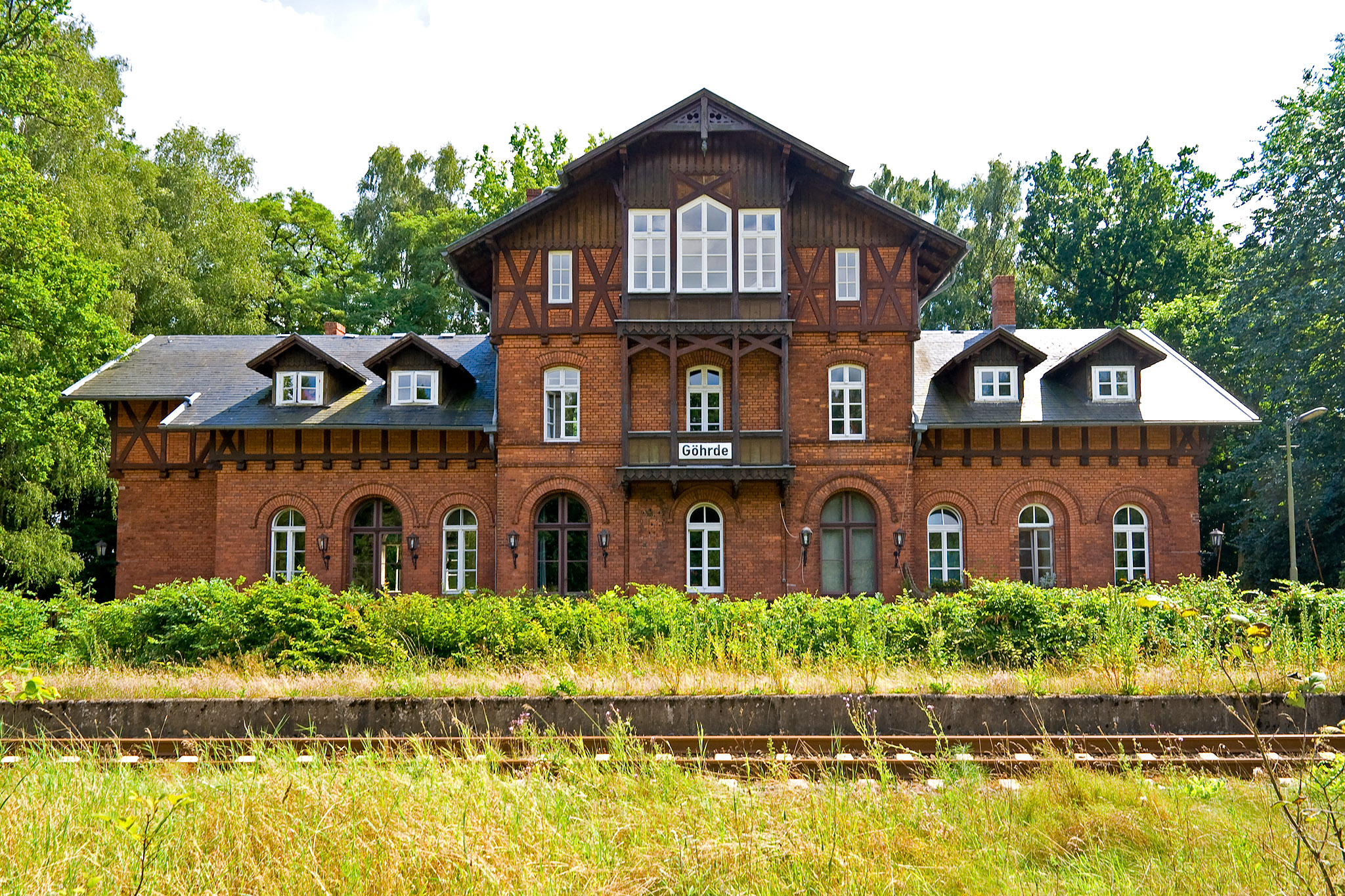
- The station building in 2007

General information
- Location: Breese am Seißelberge, Lower Saxony; Germany
- Coordinates: 53°10′4″N 10°51′5″E
- Lines: Dannenberg–Lüneburg (KBS 112 / HVV R 31)
- Platforms: 1

Other information
- Station code: AGH
- Fare zone: HVV: E/917
- Website: DB AG: Göhrde
Location

Göhrde station is a railway halt on the Dannenberg–Lüneburg railway in the northeastern part of the German state of Lower Saxony. The former through station in Breese am Seißelberge in the municipality of Nahrendorf was the destination station for imperial hunts in the nearby state forest of Göhrde (pronounced "girder"). It was built in 1874 by the Berlin-Hamburg Railway Company on the old Wittenberge-Buchholz line at kilometre stone 196.3 and is a protected monument.

The station was originally called Breese, but its name was changed in 1875 to Staatsbahnhof Göhrde (Göhrde state railway station) because of its importance to the imperial hunts which took place from 1871 to 1913 in the Göhrde. The station was also popularly known as the Kaiserbahnhof Göhrde or ("Emperor Station, Göhrde"). Since 1979 the station building has been home to the Göhrde Station Child and Youth Training Centre (Bildungsstätte Kinder- and Jugendzentrum Bahnhof Göhrde). In 1989 the station facilities were downgraded to a single track used by passenger trains only. Since then Göhrde has no longer been a station (Bahnhof) according to German railway regulations, but a halt (Haltepunkt). The halt is on timetable route KBS 112 (as of 2008) and, since 2004, has been the eastern limit of the Hamburg Transport Network (Hamburger Verkehrsverbund), or HVV, on regional route 31. It is classified as a category 6 station (local halt), its facilities equating to those of a bus stop.

== History ==
A railway halt at Breese am Seißelberge was first mentioned in August 1869 in an explanatory report about preparations for the construction of the Wittenberge-Buchholz branch. At the time only a halt was planned – and it would have been the only one on the line; all the other stopping points were stations. When the construction of the line was already well under way and the opening of the section to Hitzacker was imminent in October 1873, the first designs for a station at Breese were unfolded by the Berlin-Hamburg Railway. It was intended from the outset as the reception station for the emperor's hunting parties and was built in the following year, 1874. The station was ceremonially opened on 26 November 1874 on the occasion of the first visit by the German Emperor.

The construction of the railway and the station at the northern end of the former Rundling village of Breese am Seißelberge, along with its associated road that ran parallel to the railway, changed the appearance of the village and gave it a rectangular shape.

With the end of the monarchy in Germany in 1918, the heyday of the station was over and no more hunting parties or high-ranking personalities arrived. From then on the station, and particularly the station building, were fully used for railway operations and were modified several times thereafter. During the time of the Third Reich the Nazi leadership and the Reichsbahn management certainly had further plans to use the station for high-ranking occasions and thus to double the size of the station buildings, but they did not come to fruition. Allegedly Hermann Göring did not consent to hunting in the Göhrde.

During the Reichsbahn era the station was an operating point that reported to the railway office at Wittenberge and belonged to the Hamburg Reichsbahn division. It was grouped into the fourth and lowest category (by comparison Lüneburg was a first class station, Dahlenburg third class and Dannenberg Ost second class).

After the Second World War, through traffic over the river Elbe was severed and the importance of the line shrank to a regional railway, just serving Lüchow-Dannenberg district. At the same time the use of private transport gained increasing momentum. In the post-war years the Deutsche Bundesbahn concentrated on the functional preservation of the station and on simplifying railway operations. The preservation of the historic buildings faded into the background.

In 1979 the Deutsche Bundesbahn sold the station building in a run-down state to the Göhrde Station Child and Youth Training Centre. The station was placed under conservation protection in 1981 and work began on its restoration in 1983. The interior of the station building was converted into a training centre and restored to its original historic appearance externally.

In 1989 the last downgrading of the station facilities was carried out. Its goods facilities were closed and Göhrde became no more than a passenger halt. In 2004 the district of Lüneburg joined the Hamburg Transport Network (Hamburger Verkehrsverbund or HVV). Since 12 December 2004 the halt has been the easternmost railway station in the HVV's fare zone.

== Imperial station ==
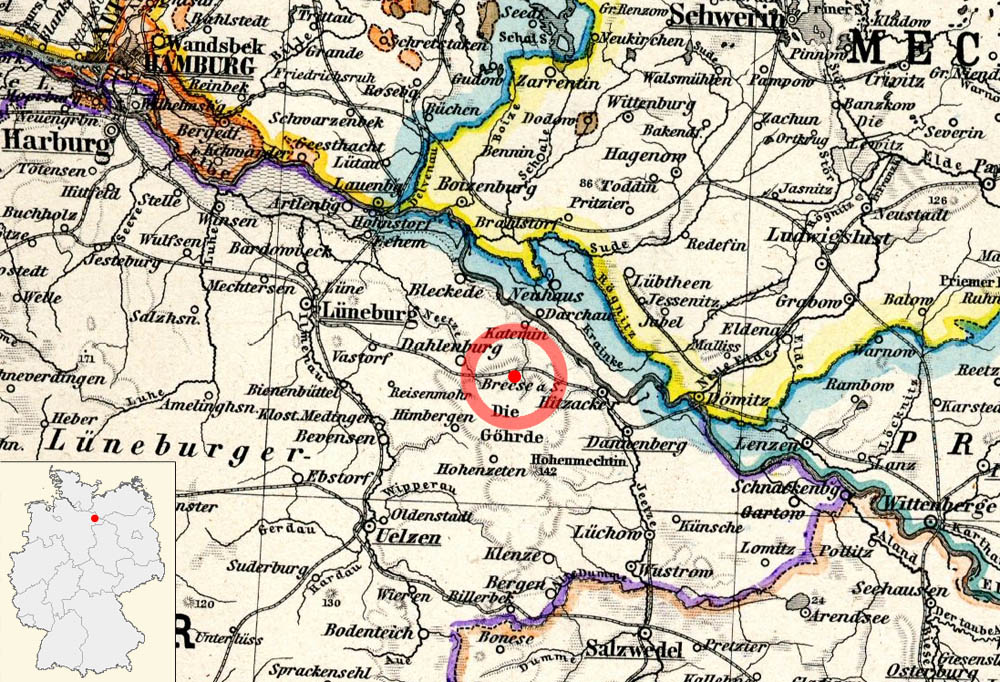
Göhrde station in Breese am Seißelberge on the Wittenberge–Buchholz branch (1891).

From 1871 the German emperor, Wilhelm I, went hunting every year with a large entourage in the Göhrde. In the early years he and his hunting party travelled from Berlin via Lehrte to Bevensen, a station that lay on the Hanover–Hamburg railway about 24 kilometres from the Göhrde Hunting Lodge. The last part of the journey had to be made by coach.

The Wittenberge–Buchholz branch was opened as far as Hitzacker on 15 December 1873. From 1874 the imperial hunting party no longer travelled to the Göhrde via Bevensen, but via Wittenberge and Breese, as the station for the Göhrde was originally called. Breese station is about 4.5 kilometres from the hunting lodge. This final part of the route was initially traversed by coach and, later, by motor vehicle.

The first imperial hunting party travelled on 26 November 1874, before the official opening of the whole line on 31 December 1874. For that reason the section from Hitzacker to Breese am Seißelberge was taken over by the police on 20 or 24 November 1874. The royal train, comprising three passenger coaches and a luggage van left Berlin at 14.30 and crossed the bridge over the Elbe at Dömitz at 17.25. At Dannenberg and Hitzacker the train halted briefly for official receptions.

Special regulations governed the transportation of royalty and VIPs. The railway staff were sworn to secrecy and all documents had to be destroyed after the journey. Reserve locomotives had to be made available at certain stations and these engines had to be facing the direction of travel of the train and ready to move as long as the royal train was in their district. The engine driver and fireman were not permitted to leave the locomotive during this time. During the journey, the train was not allowed to be subject to any impacts or heavy swaying movements. The place at which the train was to stop in the station was indicated by an official with an unfurled red flag or, during the hours of darkness, by a red light. The station was decorated ceremonially for the visit and a red carpet was laid out from the platform through the west wing of the station to the exit on the station forecourt. There was always a large crowd of the local population because everyone wanted to see the emperor. The governor's office (Landdrostei) in Lüneburg was responsible for the safety of the imperial household. During the first visit of the emperor, two sergeants (Oberwachtmeister), seven mounted gendarmes and four gendarmes on foot were employed as guards.

The last imperial hunt in the Göhrde region took place before the outbreak of the First World War on 30 and 31 October 1913. Emperor Wilhelm II had invited his sons - the princes Eitel Friedrich of Prussia, Oskar of Prussia and Joachim of Prussia - the heir to the Austrian throne, Archduke Franz Ferdinand of Austria, the Reich Chancellor, Theobald von Bethmann Hollweg, General Helmuth Johannes Ludwig von Moltke and the Austro-Hungarian ambassador, Ladislaus de Szögyény-Marich. A very large number of staff were required for the two-day event. There was a total of 90 staff, of which half were part of the emperor's permanent house staff and half were drawn from the local villages. The imperial household had travelled for 2 or 3 days prior to the hunt. In addition the invited guests brought with them one, or at most, two, servants.

== Railway facilities ==
Track plan of Göhrde station: 1–7: tracks EG: station building Gw: Main signal box at the western end Go: Pointsman's signal box at the eastern end GS: Goods shed ES: Express post shed R: Loading ramp LS: Loading area B: Platforms NG: Outbuildings (toilets, wash house, shed) as at: 1938

The station has an imposing station building on the southern side of the tracks which is accessed via a cobbled approach road from Göhrde's station road (Kreisstraße 6). The goods facilities are mostly to be found north of the tracks and there are two signal boxes: one at the western and one at the eastern approach to the station. The entire station and its approach has been placed under protection.

=== Station building ===
The three-storey station building comprises a centre section with a gable frontage, and two wings, one and a half storeys high, with gables at the ends. It was built in brick with timber framing. Its wooden carvings were intended to give it the appearance of a hunting lodge. The offices are in the centre of the building. The west wing was reserved for VIPs, and there were two waiting rooms in the east wing. One waiting room was available to all travellers, while the other could be reserved in order to avoid having to mix with ordinary people. On the first floor of the centre section was a flat for the stationmaster and on the second floor were two flats for the signalmen. Other station staff lived in the neighbouring village of Pommoissel.

West of the station building stood a small shed for handling express goods. East of the station building were three outbuildings: a toilet, a wash house and a stable.

The station building was modified several times over the course of the years, the first being in 1909. The attic of the east wing was partially upgraded to take 3 bedrooms. After 1918 the whole building could be used for railway operations or by the railway staff. In 1925/26 a 2 1/2-room flat was built for a gang foreman (Rottenführer, a Rotte was a gang of track workers) in the west wing, which in imperial times had been reserved exclusively for VIPs, and cellars were built under half the area of the wing. The public waiting room was converted in 1935 into a station restaurant and the reservable waiting room into the restaurant kitchen. A small beer cellar was established underneath. The usable area of the offices in the central section was halved and used as living quarters (Wohnraum) and a club room (Klubzimmer). In the wings, the dormer windows facing the tracks were replaced by bay windows, the open balcony on the street side was closed in by windows and all the chimney tops were replaced.

The fourth modification took place in 1967 during the Deutsche Bundesbahn era and had the widest reaching consequences for the architectural style of the building. The preservation of the old structure took a back seat in favour of a simple functional design. This was most visible in the roof, where the slates were replaced by corrugated asbestos sheets and the dormers on the forecourt side removed. The doors to the balcony on the first floor were replaced by a single-casement window and the conservatories on the second floor were removed, all bar their support frames. Originally the balconies were to have been completely torn down, but for structural reasons that would have taken a great deal of work and so this did not happen on grounds of cost. The two-piece transom windows (Sprossenfenster) on the first floor were almost all replaced by simple single-casement windows.

At the end of 1983, the Göhrde Station Child and Youth Centre began restoration work on the station building and remaining outbuildings. The work was financially supported by the state of Lower Saxony and the Federal Government and, largely under their own initiative, carried out by workshop projects for unemployed people or by interested individuals.

The first phase saw the west wing being restored. The attic was converted into a living and sleeping area for twelve people. On the forecourt and track sides two double-raftered dormers were built and the timber-framed facade and the rooms in the centre section were restored. In the centre section, the balconies were rebuilt and were given copies of the original doors based on an original blueprint. All the windows on the first floor were replaced in order to recreate its former appearance and chimney pots of the original design were added.

The old offices on the ground floor were restored to their original dimensions, the station restaurant was renovated and the roof was recovered with slates again.

=== Halt ===
The present-day halt is located immediately west of the old station building. On the former home platform stands a wooden passenger shelter and a timetable poster. Passenger trains stop at what used to be platform 2 and is now platform 1. The platform has a usable length of 142 metres. The halt can be accessed on foot without the use of steps, but the poorly surfaced platform is too low to enable entry to the coaches at the same height. There is a smoking ban at the halt as at all other Deutsche Bahn stations and stops. A small smoking area with a sign at the end of the unmetalled footpath that leads from the approach road alongside private land to the halt, makes the point clear.

=== Goods facilities ===
Opposite the station building there used to be a goods shed and a loading ramp designed for both side- and end-loading. On the loading ramp were cattle pens for loading cattle. Both facilities were located at the end of a loading road, which could be accessed via a level crossing at the western end of the station. Apart from the loading road, there was only an unmetalled farm track on the other side of the level crossing.

The loading area up to the old goods shed is still in the ownership of the Deutsche Bahn AG. The goods shed is now privately owned.

=== Track layout ===
The station used to have seven tracks in all. Tracks 1 and 2 were used for passenger trains, tracks 5 to 7 for goods traffic. Track 1 was the main running track on the line and ran alongside the home platform in front of the station building. Between tracks 1 and 2 there was an island platform from which passengers could access the crossing and passing loop - track 2. Track 3 was another crossing and passing loop and track 4 was a storage siding. Track 5 ran alongside the goods shed and loading ramp. Track 6 was a stub siding that ended at the head of the loading ramp. Track 7 was the loading siding alongside the loading road.

The first dismantling of the trackage took place in 1956 when the storage siding, track 4, was lifted. In the second half of the 1970s the crossing and passing loop, track 3 and the section of track 5 parallel to the loading siding (track 7) was removed. The goods siding, track 5, and the main running line, track 1, were lifted in 1989. The remaining track 2 was connected directly to the running line at both ends.

=== Signalling and safety equipment ===
The station was protected by ten semaphore signals. At both ends of the station there were a twin-armed entry signal and a distant signal. Exit signals were installed at both ends of tracks 1 to 3. All exit signals were single-armed until the end of the 1930s. The signals on the crossing and passing loops, tracks 2 and 3, were then given a second arm so that the "proceed slowly" aspect could be displayed. Tracks 4 to 7 were secured by derailers between tracks 3 and 4, so that stored railway vehicles could not inadvertently roll onto the lines being used by through traffic. The level crossing to the loading road was originally gated.

The points, signal installations and level crossing barriers were controlled by two signal boxes. The main signal box (Befehlsstellwerk), designated by the letters Gw, was located at the western end of the station next to the level crossing; and a subsidiary or "pointsmen's" signal box (Wärterstellwerk), designated as Go, at the eastern end.

In the late 1950s operations on the line were downgraded to a simplified branch line service by the Deutsche Bundesbahn. As a result, the signal boxes, signals, point drives for the remotely controlled points and barriers were removed. The level crossing has since been protected by flashing lights. The entry turnouts were thrown, when necessary, by train crews using a lever apparatus located in a shelter by the station building.

== Services ==
The halt is currently served by Regionalbahn (RB) trains on scheduled route 112 from Lüneburg to Dannenberg Ost, which at the same time is Regionalbahn line 31 to Göhrde on the Hamburg Transport Network (HVV). The other stops in the direction of Dannenberg are no longer within the HVV fare zone. Since the turn of the year 1988/89 goods have no longer been handled at the station. The station has always been a stop for all passenger trains. The most important trains that stopped at Göhrde were the fast-stopping trains (Eilzüge) in the 1960s to 1980s that ran through to Hamburg.

=== Passenger services ===
Following the opening of the Wittenberge–Buchholz branch to Buchholz in der Nordheide, two pairs of passenger trains and a pair of mixed trains stopped at Göhrde station daily, enabling through connexions to Wittenberge and Buchholz. The number of train connexions did not change when the Berlin-Hamburg Railway was nationalised in 1884. Journey times in the early years were about 66 minutes to Lüneburg and 44 minutes to Dannenberg. The price of a single, second class ticket to Lüneburg in 1880 was 200 pfennigs and a third class ticket was 130 pfennigs. A single to Dannenberg cost 120 pfennigs in second class and 80 pfennigs in third class.

At the beginning of the 1910s the branch in Lüneburg was split into two lines and through services to Buchholz ceased. The passenger trains stopping in Göhrde now started and finished their journeys at Lüneburg. After the Second World War the line was severed when the Russians dropped the bridge over the Elbe at Dömitz; through services to Wittenberge were now no longer possible. The passenger trains that stopped at the station were largely restricted to those working the Lüneburg–Dannenberg Ost route. The only exceptions were the occasional Eilzug pairs that ran from the 1960s onwards, the so-called "semi-fast hedgerow trains" (Heckeneilzüge), that sometimes provided through connexions to Hamburg Hauptbahnhof. These semi-fast trains were withdrawn when the timetable changed in May 1988.

The number of passenger trains stopping at Göhrde varied during the 20th century between six and fourteen daily. On average five pairs of trains ran each day. Before the First World War there were seven pairs in the timetable; this number reduced during the war to five. The last timetable used before the Second World War had five pairs of trains in it, of two were dropped during the war years and the immediate post-war period. In the 1950s, ten passenger trains stopped at the station on workdays, just as many as in the winter timetable of 1988/89.

Currently five Regionalbahn trains pass each way on workdays, running every 3 hours. On Sundays and holidays they run every four hours; three trains working the line to Lüneburg and four to Dannenberg. The journey time to Lüneburg is 42 minutes and to Dannenberg, 26 minutes. The HVV fare for a single ticket from Göhrde to Lüneburg in second class is 2.60 euros and the normal DB fare for a single from Göhrde to Dannenberg is 4.90 euros.

=== Goods traffic ===
Goods were handled at Göhrde station from the outset and data is available from the early years of the station's life. According to these figures, Göhrde station handled 23 tonne-kilometres (cf. Lüneburg 1782, Dahlenburg 39 and Dannenberg 708 tonne-kilometres).

Amongst the goods delivered to Göhrde were food, in the form of part-piece loads, and artificial fertiliser, briquets and coke, peat, sugar beet scraps and other feedstuffs in full wagon loads. Goods dispatched included eating and seed potatoes, sugar beet, straw, hay, pit props, oak, beech and spruce logs, animals for slaughter and for breeding. Even by imperial times, grain was loaded for dispatch to Berlin. In the 1920s wood for dolphins was delivered from Göhrde to Hamburg Harbour and, in the post-war years, large quantities of pit props were sent to the Ruhr area. Sugar beet was loaded here until the late 1980s. In the last years before the goods facilities were closed logs were the only freight to be loaded at Göhrde.

From the end of the 1960s, goods were handled by a local goods train (Nahgüterzug) that ran from Lüneburg to Dannenberg Ost. Although it did not stop at Göhrde station, the wagons were only transported as far as Dahlenburg. From Dahlenburg the freight was then delivered to Göhrde on a goods transfer train (Übergabegüterzug), which was hauled by a light shunter of the Kleinlokomotive or Köf type. Freight was dispatched again using a Nahgüterzug from Dannenberg Ost to Lüneburg, that returned again after reaching the Dannenberg terminus at the end of the line. In the 1980s, goods were transported exclusively by transfer trains to and from Lüneburg. During the sugar beet harvest, additional goods trains were laid on. These entailed a Köf, stationed in Dannenberg Ost, hauling a transfer train twice a week from Dannenberg to Göhrde and back.

== Training centre ==
The Göhrde Station Child and Youth Centre (Kinder- und Jugendzentrum Bahnhof Göhrde) has run a training centre in the station building at Göhrde and on the land south of the tracks since 1979.

The old station building has overnight accommodation, toilets and bathrooms, kitchens and common rooms for up to 45 people. Its facilities includes a film and photographic laboratory, a screen printing facility, workshop, beehive, a vegetable garden and fruit orchard and a multi-purpose field.

== Photos ==
Göhrde station

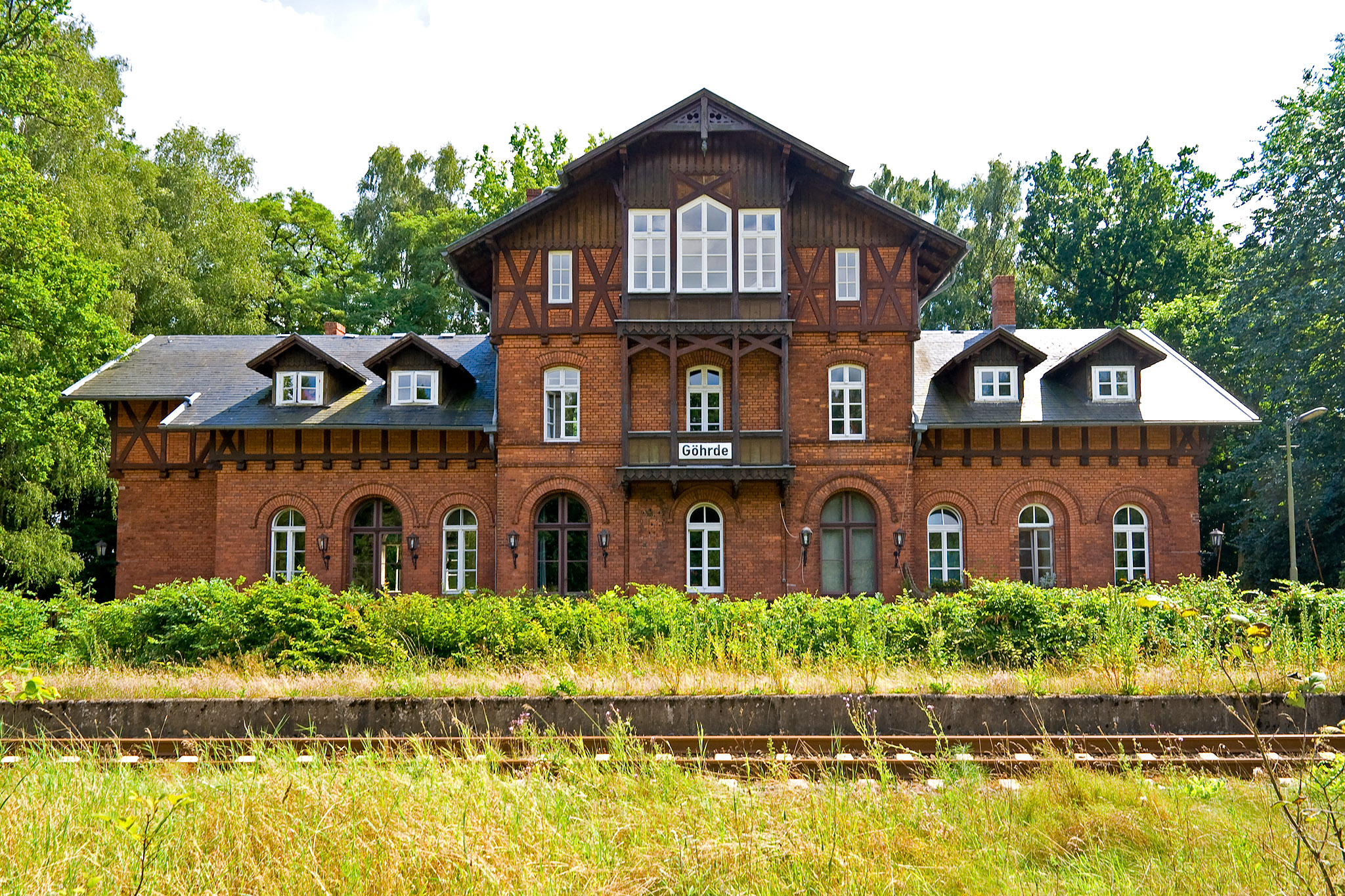
Station building: offices in the central section of the building, living accommodation above. West wing (right) for VIPs, waiting room in the east wing.

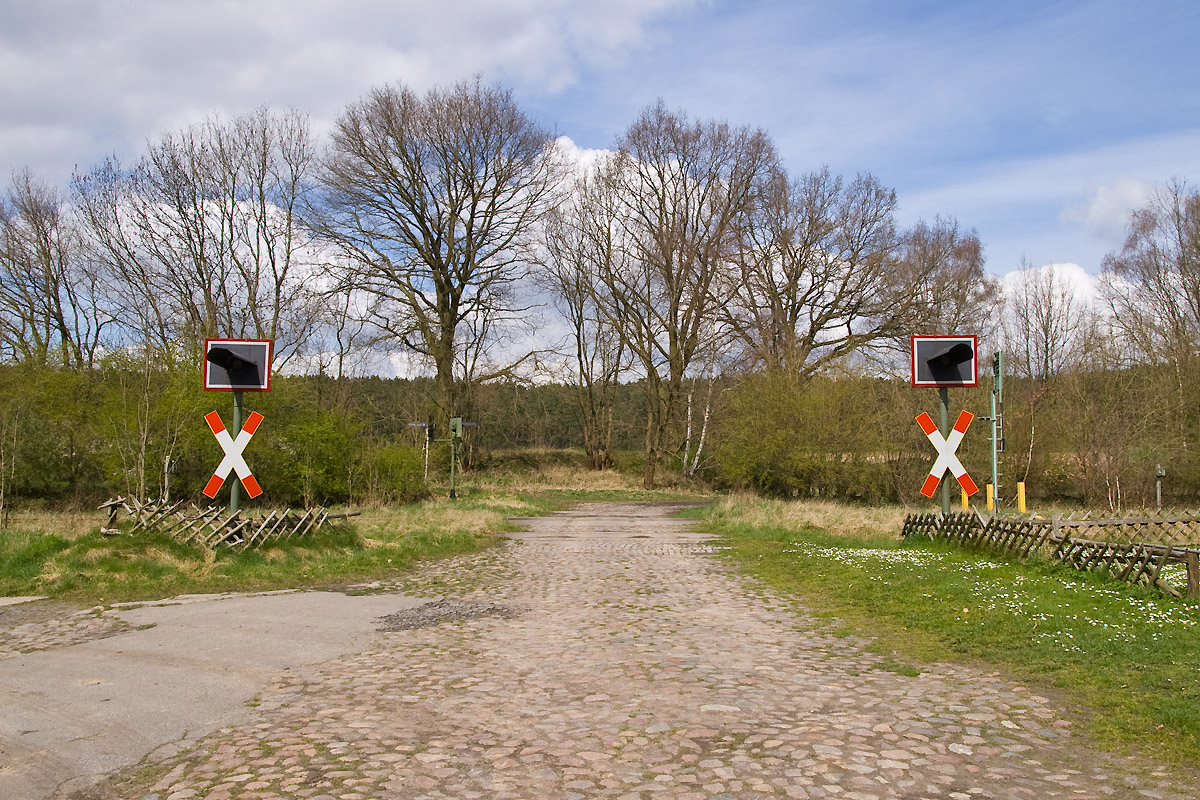
Level crossing to the former loading area and an unmetalled farm track at the western end.

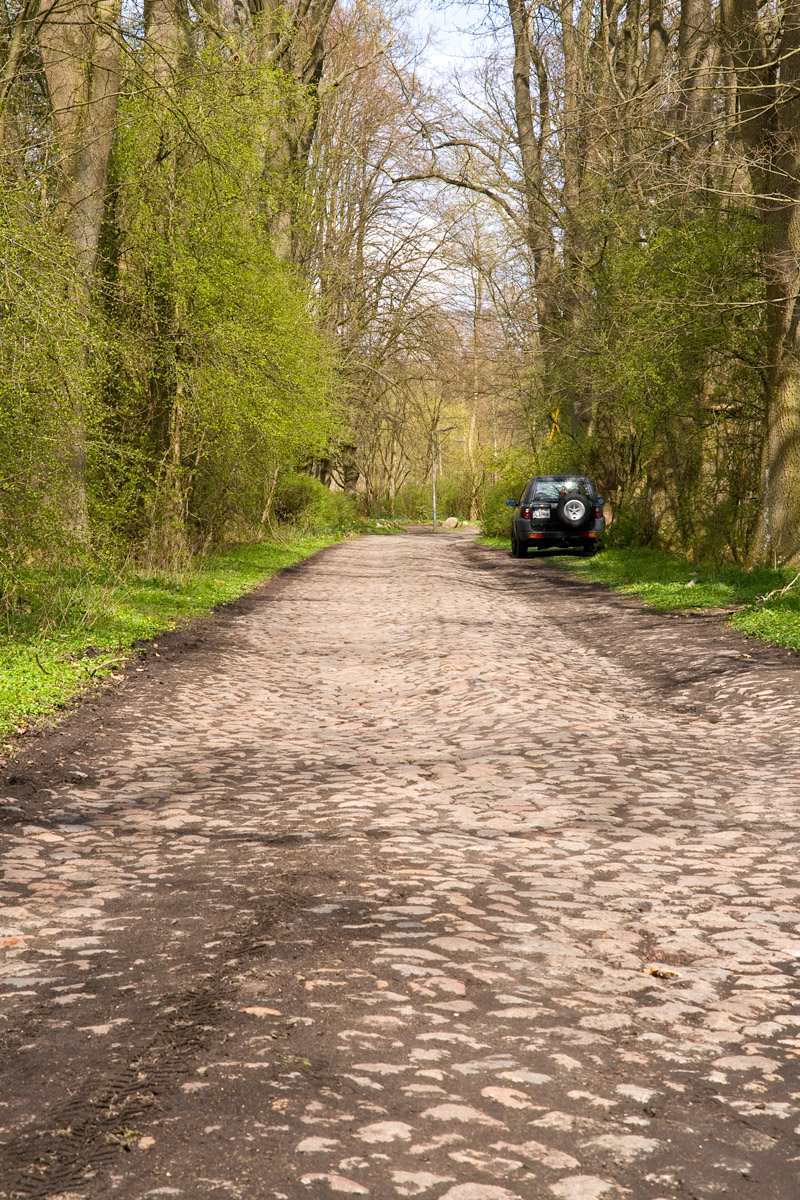
The cobbled approach to the station is under conservation protection.

== Literature ==
- Ulrich Bornmüller; Dr. Rolf Meyer (Red.) (April 1990), Eisenbahnzeit in the Wendland. Beiträge zur Eisenbahngeschichte of the districtes Lüchow-Dannenberg (in German), Wustrow, Schnega: Hartmut Geller, Museumsverein Wustrow e.V., ISBN 3-925861-06-8
- Benno Wiesmüller, Erich Preuß (ed.), "Göhrde", The große Archiv der deutschen Bahnhöfe (in German), München: GeraMond-Verlag, ISSN 0949-2127
