= Drawehn =

Region in Germany

Coordinates: 53.0442°N 10.9094°E

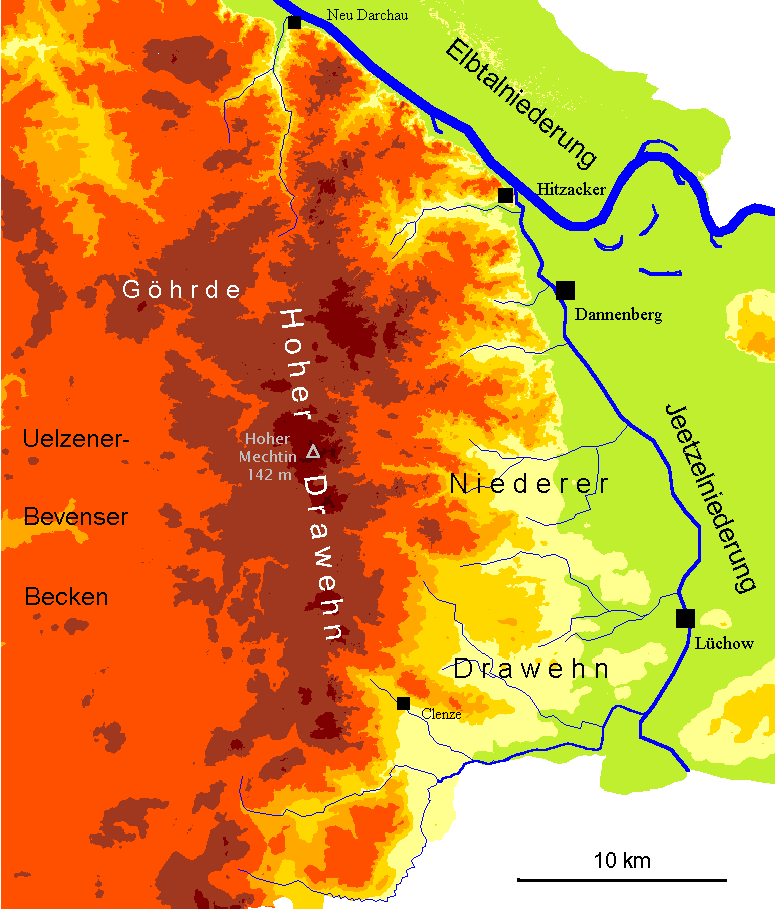
Relief map of the Drawehn area

The Drawehn is a partly wooded and partly agricultural region of hills in the northeastern part of the German state of Lower Saxony, lying between the districts of Lüneburg and Uelzen in the west and Lüchow-Dannenberg in the east.

It is named after the Slavic tribe of the Drevani.

== Definition ==
In the German federal system of natural geographic regions, the Drawehn forms the eastern end of the Lüneburg Heath (D28), the Ostheide, bordering the neighbouring area of Wendland and Altmark (D29). From a cultural perspective the Drawehn is, however, largely oriented towards Wendland. Its precise boundary is not clear: the name is often used synonymously for the ridge known as the East Hanoverian End Moraine (Osthannoverschen Endmoräne). Then again it may refer only to its southern portion - the northern part being referred to as the Göhrde. Sources from the 14th to the 16th century counted the entire upper and lower geest west of the Jeetze plain and east of the Uelzen-Bevensen Bowl as well as the Dahlenburg Basin as the Drawehn. In this sense the term is defined as the main ridge of the East Hanoverian End Moraine including its foothills as well as the flatter eastern slopes to the fluviatile Lüchow plain. The northern end of the East Hanoverian End Moraine can be further subdivided into the Göhrde and Klötzie regions – with no clear cut transition or boundary. The Klötzie (also the Elbhöhen or "Elbe Heights") is the northern edge of the ridge, up to 70 metres high, which slopes steeply down to the glacial valley of the River Elbe between Hitzacker and Neu Darchau. And Göhrde refers to the more or less wooded terrain of the Göhrde State Forest (rather than the administrative area) which is located on a rolling area of high ground on the northwest part of the ridge.

== Formation ==
The old moraine landscape of Lower Saxony emerged in the course of four great glacial advances of the Scandinavian ice sheet 350,000 to 130,000 years ago – one during the Elster glaciation and three during the Saale glaciation. The glacier of the most recent, Weichselian glaciation only reached the northeastern edge of the present Elbe valley depression, so that the existing terminal moraines beyond that point there were only affected periglacially, for example in the shape of solifluction over the frozen ground, by meltwater erosion and sediments or through wind-blown deposits of sand. The last two Saale glaciation advances in particular, the Drenthe II and the Warthe stadia, unfolded the East Hanonerian Terminal Moraine. It is therefore geomorphologically younger than the geest in western and central Lower Saxony, but clearly older than the young moraine landscapes in Mecklenburg-Vorpommern and Ostholstein (= Baltic Uplands).

== Sources and further information ==
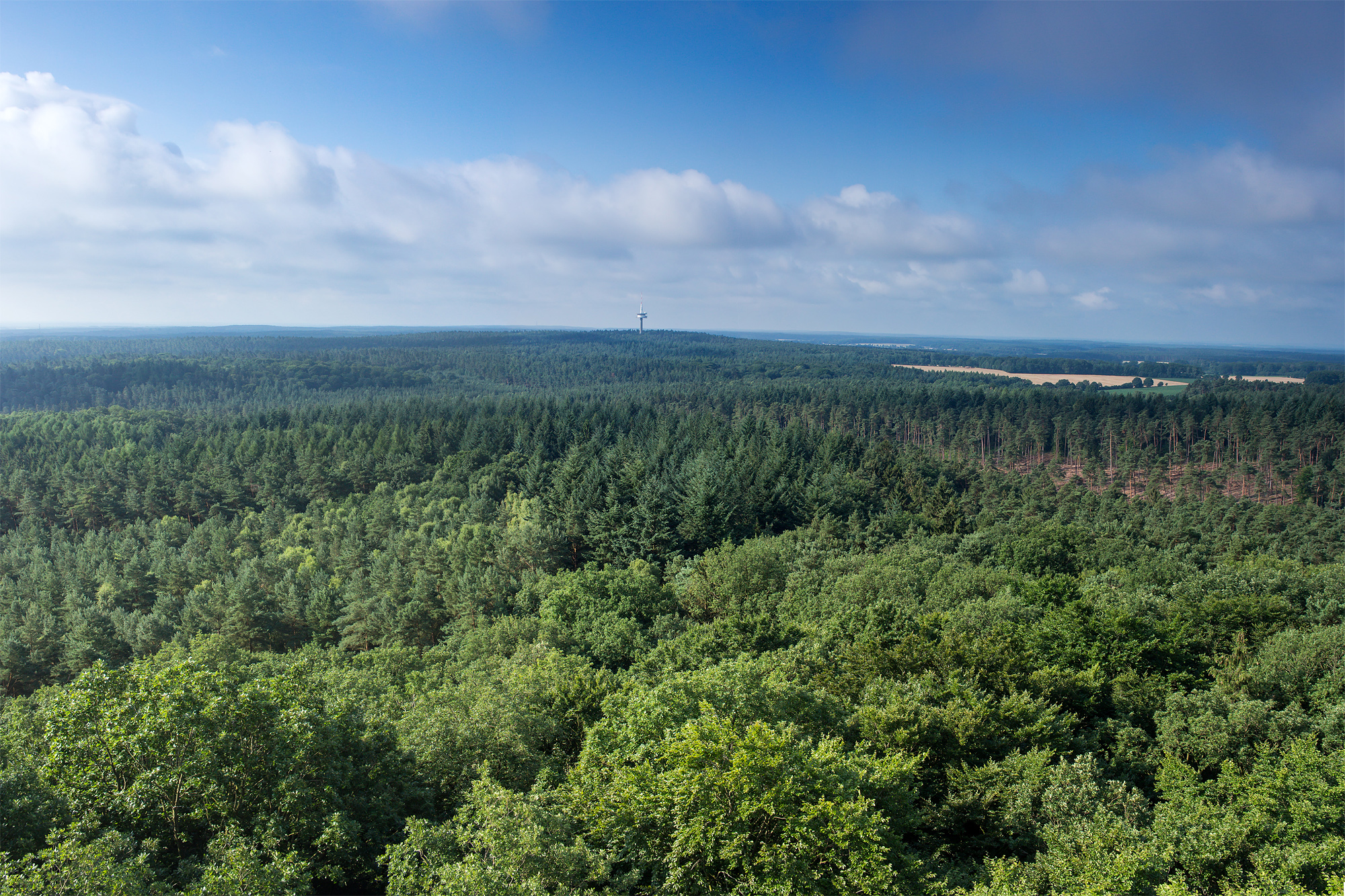
View from the observation tower on the Hoher Mechtin looking south

- Klaus Duphorn & Ulrich Schneider: Zur Geologie und Geomorphologie des Naturparks Elbufer-Drawehn. – Abhandlungen des Naturwissenschaftlichen Vereins in Hamburg (NF) 25 (1983): Mittelelbe und Drawehn - Lebensräume, Flora und Fauna im Hannoverschen Wendland. pp. 9-40. ISBN 3-490-14096-6
- Lisel Gillandt, Eckhard Grimmel & Johannes M. Martens: Naturräumliche Gliederung des Kreises Lüchow-Dannenberg aus biologischer Sicht. – Abhandlungen des Naturwissenschaftlichen Vereins in Hamburg (NF) 25 (1983): Mittelelbe und Drawehn - Lebensräume, Flora und Fauna im Hannoverschen Wendland. pp. 133–150. ISBN 3-490-14096-6
- Wolfgang Jürries & Berndt Wachter (Hrsg.): Wendland-Lexikon, Band 1, A–K. Schriftenreihe des Heimatkundlichen Arbeitskreises Lüchow-Dannenberg, Band 12, Lüchow 2000 (2. Aufl. 2008). ISBN 978-3-926322-28-9
- HB-Verlag (Hrsg.): Naturpark Elbufer-Drawehn. – Naturmagazin draußen, Heft 9 (1980), Hamburg.
- Dieter Knabenschuh: Wendland, Elbufer, Drawehn. – FDNF Fahrradtouristik GbR, Gartow, 1997. ISBN 3-930431-10-6
- Hansjörg Küster: Geschichte der Landschaft in Mitteleuropa. Von der Eiszeit bis zur Gegenwart. – Verlag C. H. Beck, München, 1995/1999. ISBN 3-406-45357-0
- Richard Pott: Lüneburger Heide, Wendland und Nationalpark Mittleres Elbtal. – Kulturlandschaften Exkursionsführer, Ulmer-Verlag, Stuttgart, 1999. ISBN 3-8001-3515-9
