= Hoher Mechtin =

Mountain in northern Germany

Coordinates: 53°2′41.3″N 10°54′38.8″E

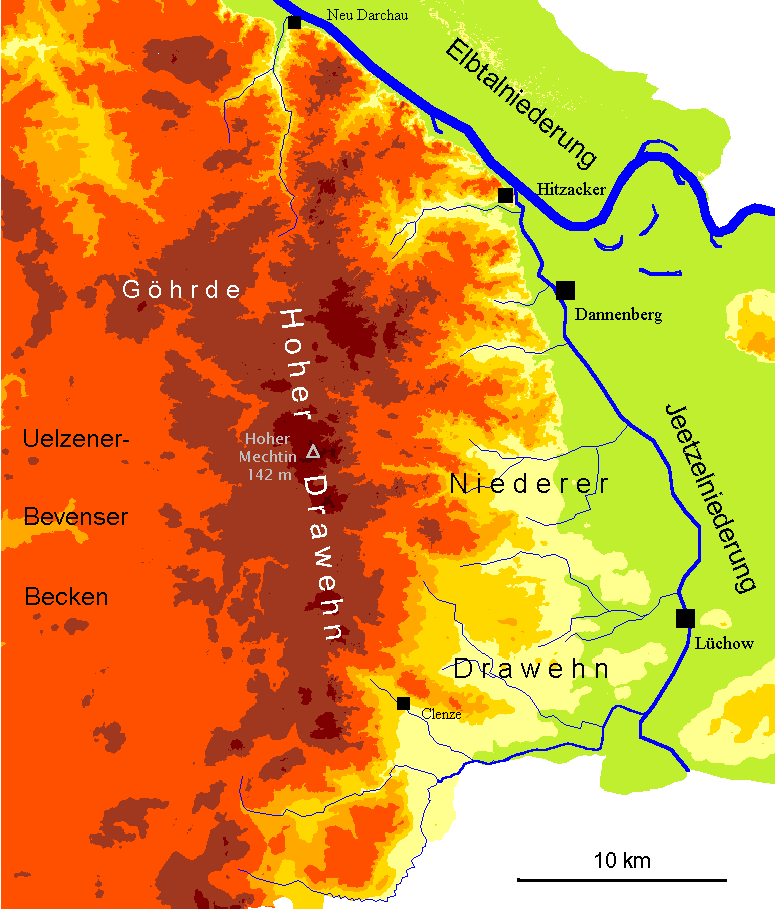
Location of the Hoher Mechtin in the Drawehn; key to relief map(light green: land below 20 m, orange-red: 50 - 75 m, dark brown: over 100 m)

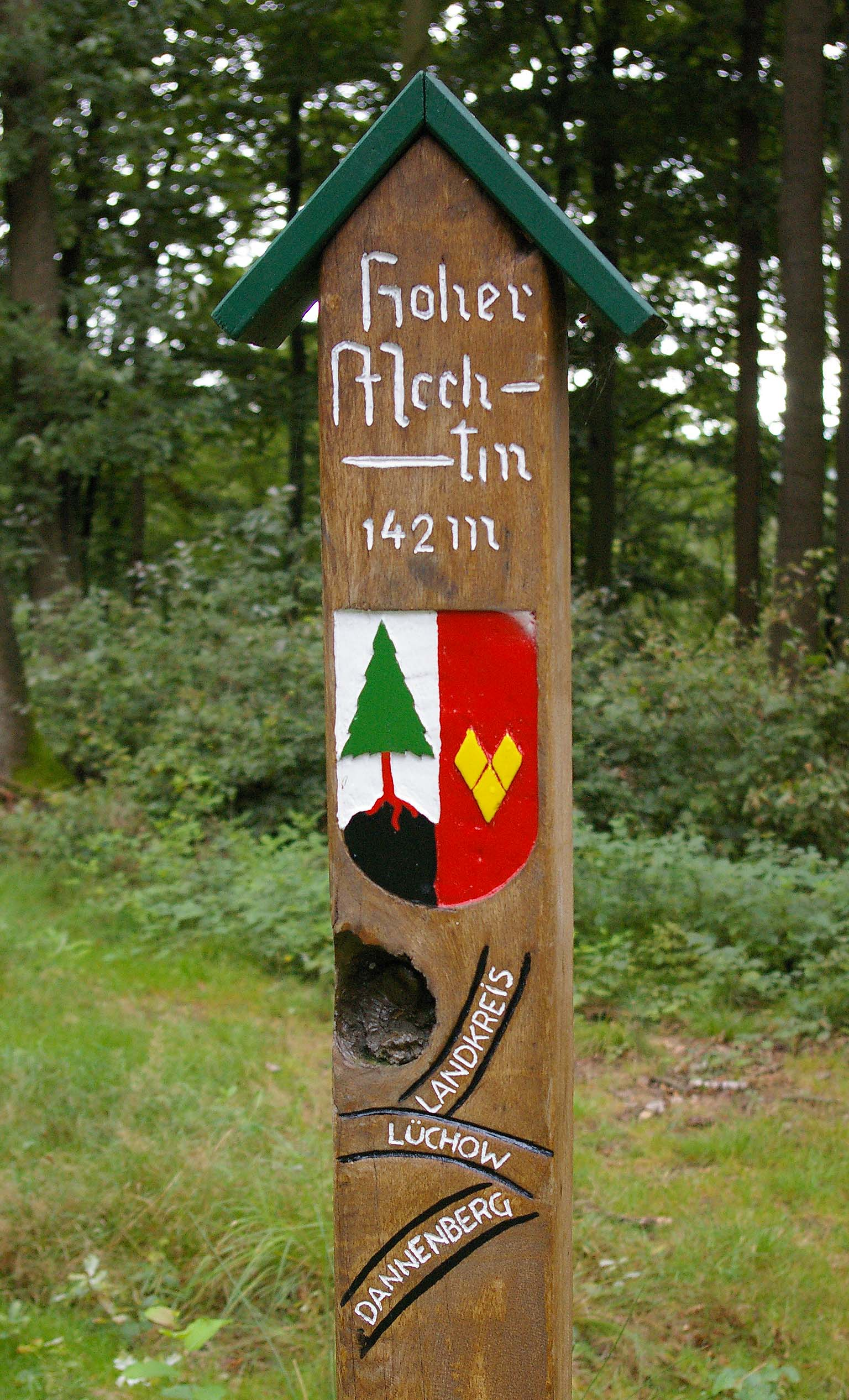
Sign at the "summit"

At a height of 142 m above sea level (NN) (466 feet) the Hoher Mechtin is the highest elevation in the Wendland in the district of Lüchow-Dannenberg in northern Germany, and is at the same time a significant high point on the entire North German Plain. It lies roughly at the centre point of the Drawehn ridge, which is also described as the East Hanoverian gravel or end moraine. (Osthannoversche Kies- or Endmoräne). The area is part of the Ostheide division of the Lüneburg Heath.

Debris consisting of sand, loam, gravel, stones and glacial erratics several metres across was transported southwards by the glacier flowing from Scandinavia in a series of advances in the Saale glaciation, leaving the Drawehn behind as an end moraine after it melted. Today the area is predominantly covered in pine forest, but mixed deciduous forest comprising oak, birch, beech and other trees dominates the scene in a few places, especially on the high spots and slopes.

On the summit of the Hoher Mechtin is a wooden observation tower, rebuilt in 2015.

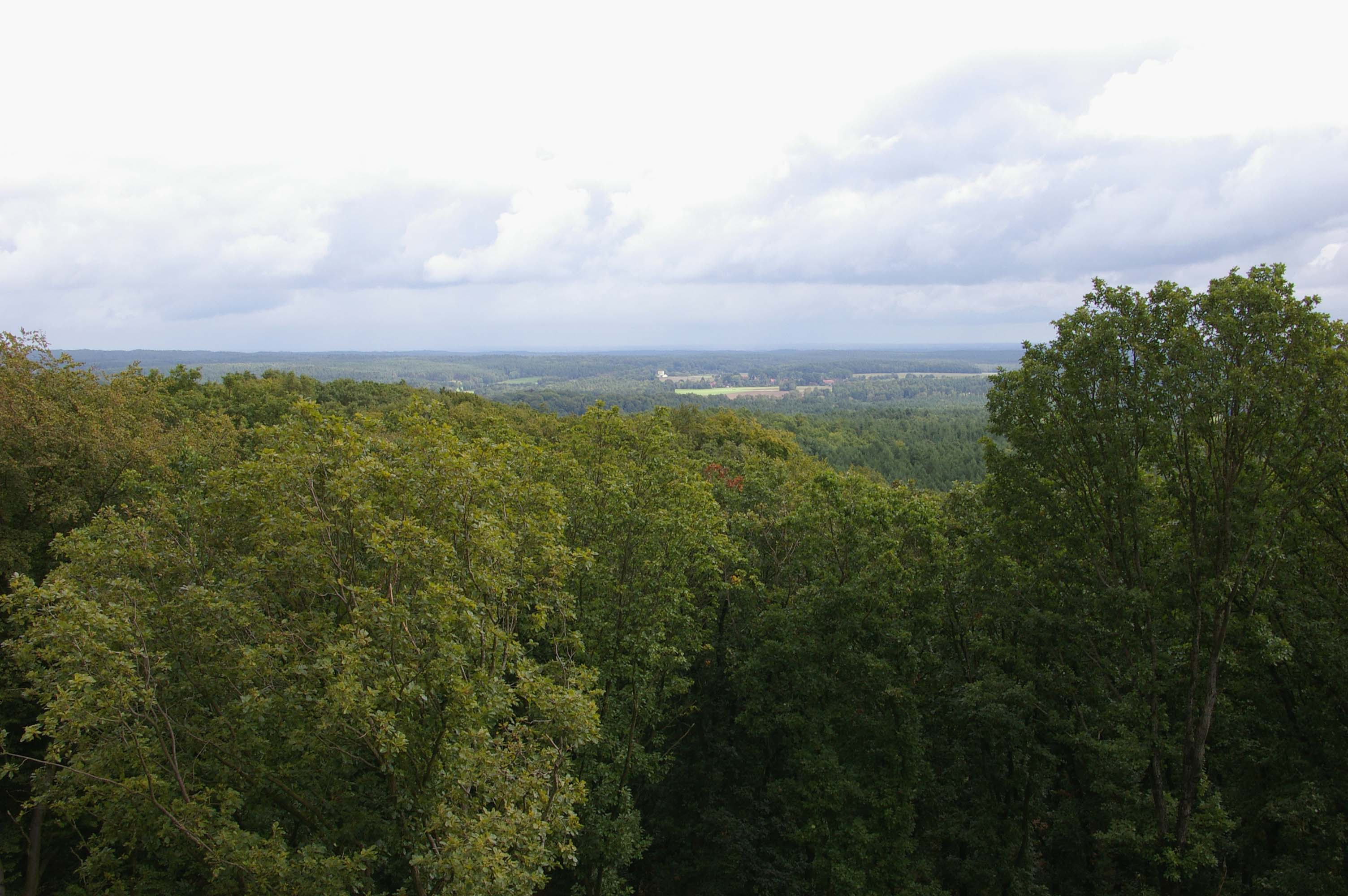
View to the north-east

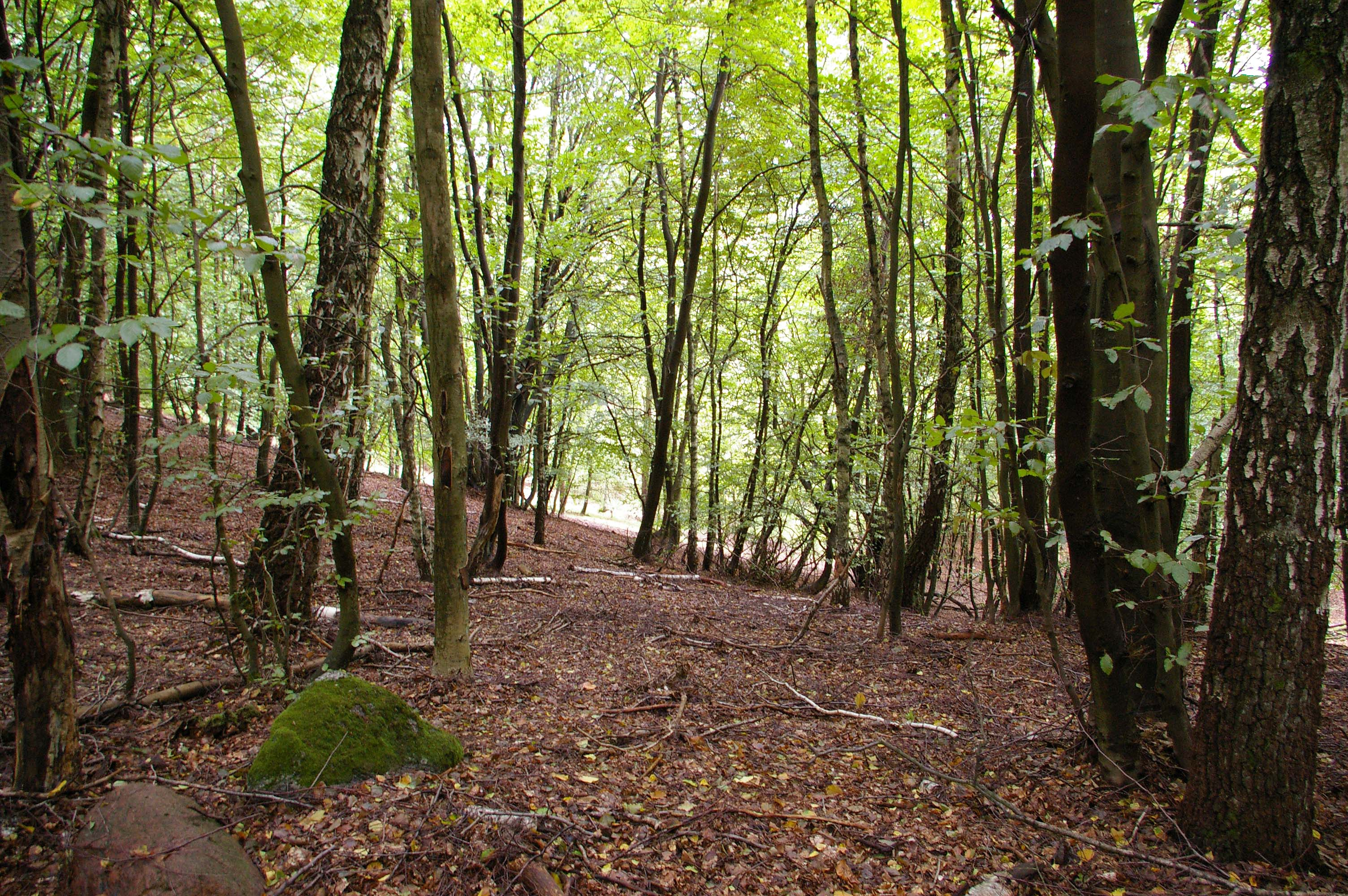
Wooded slopes

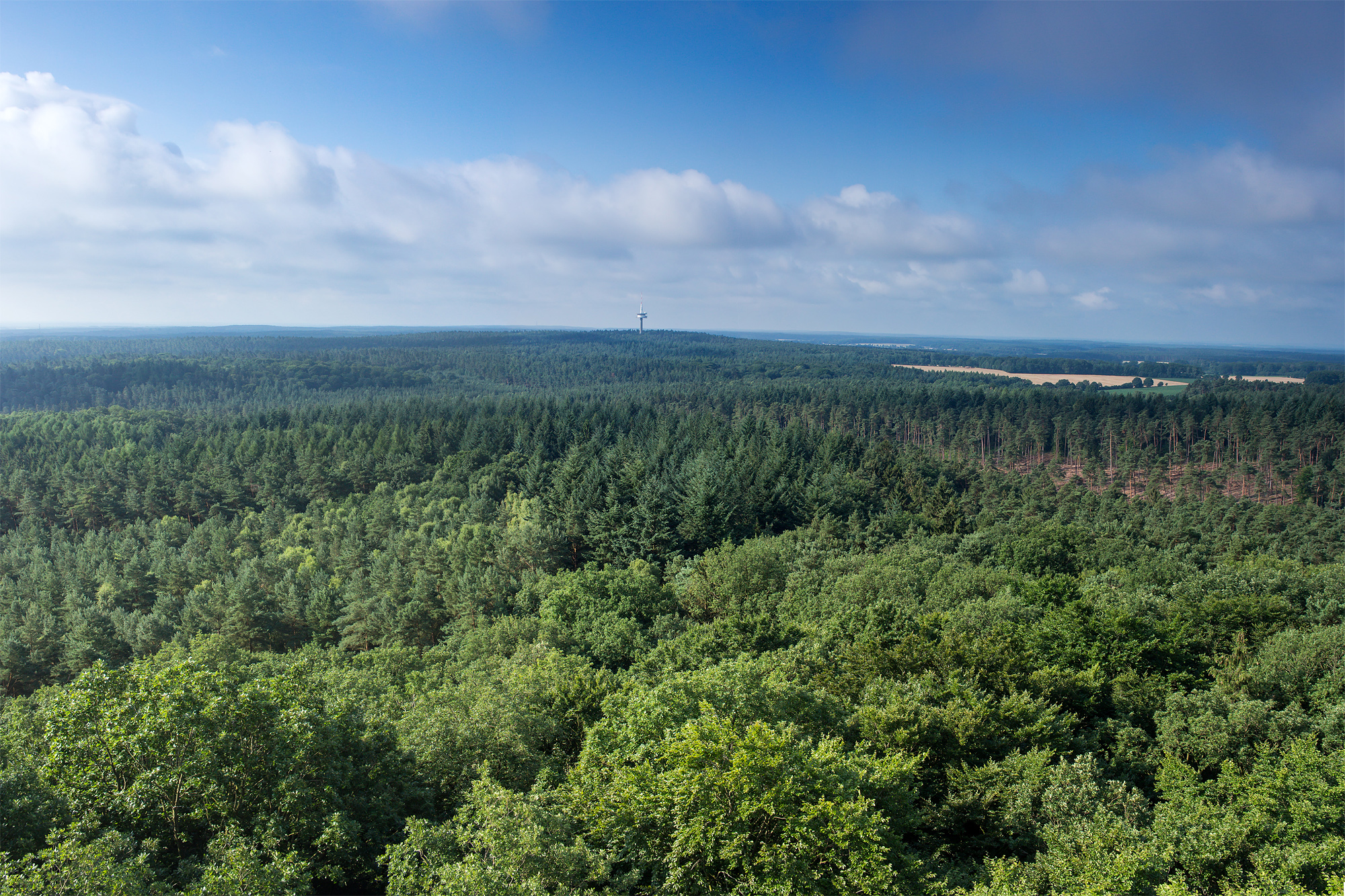
View to the south

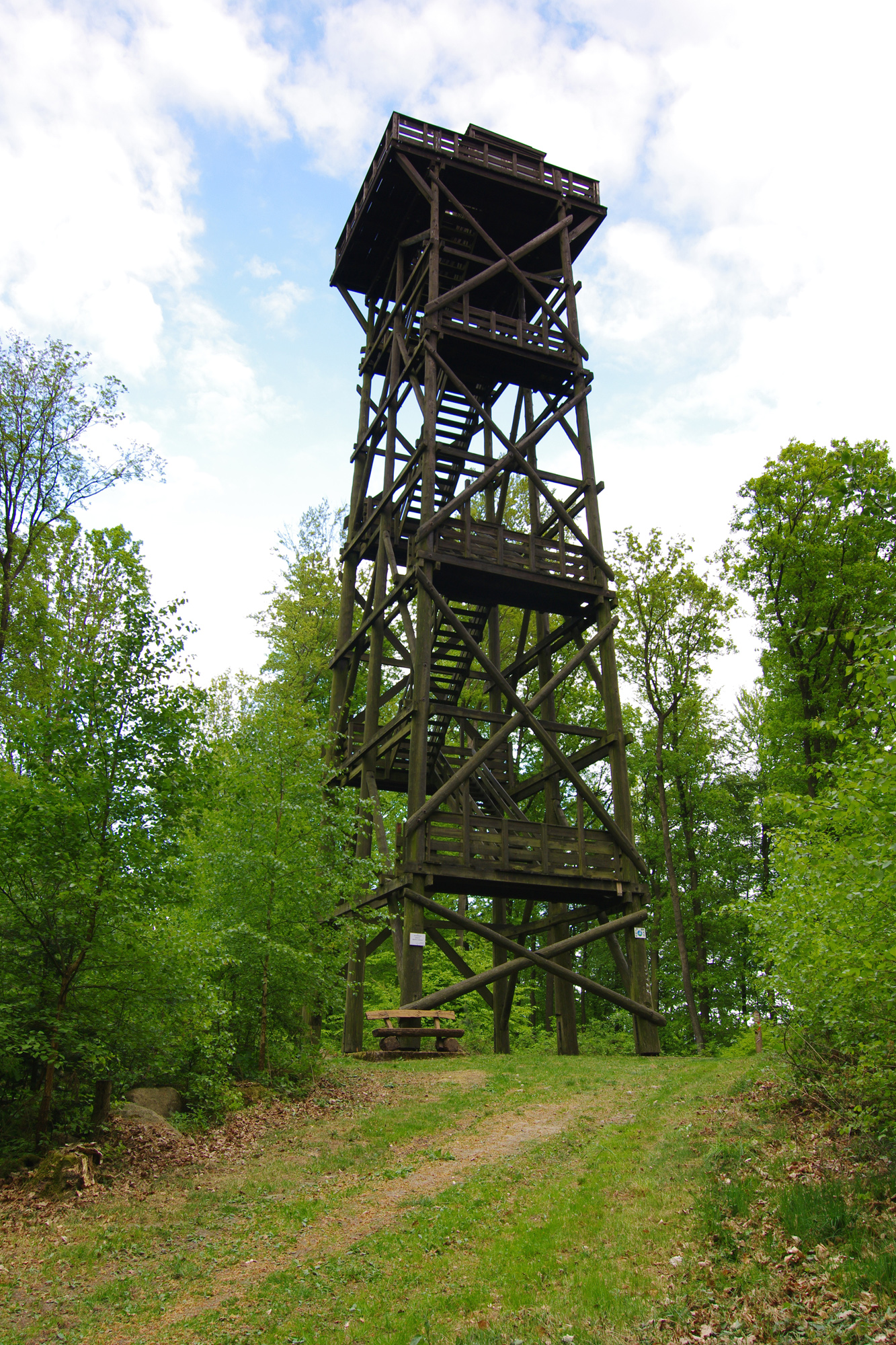
Former observation tower (2011)

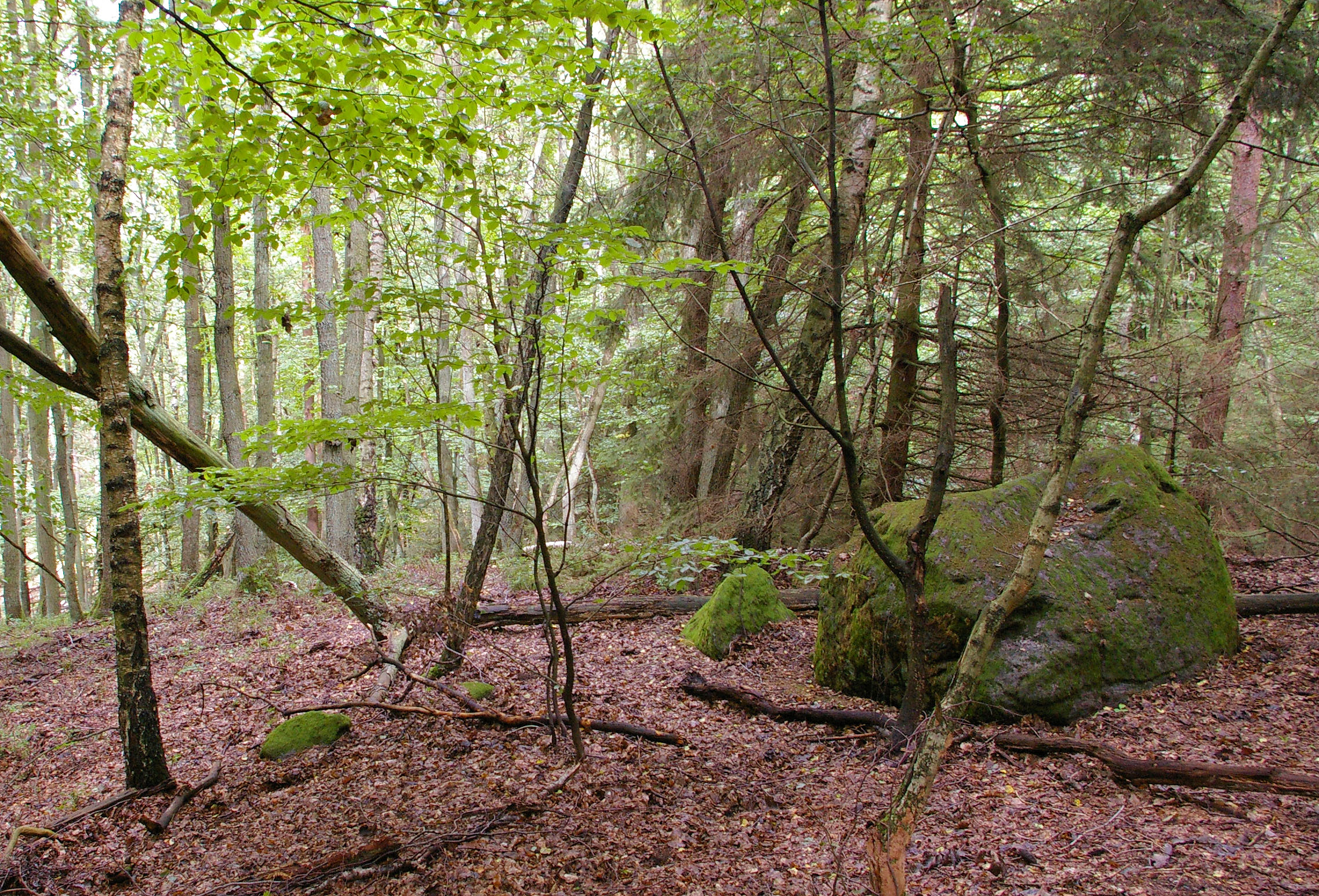
Glacier-deposited rock in the forest

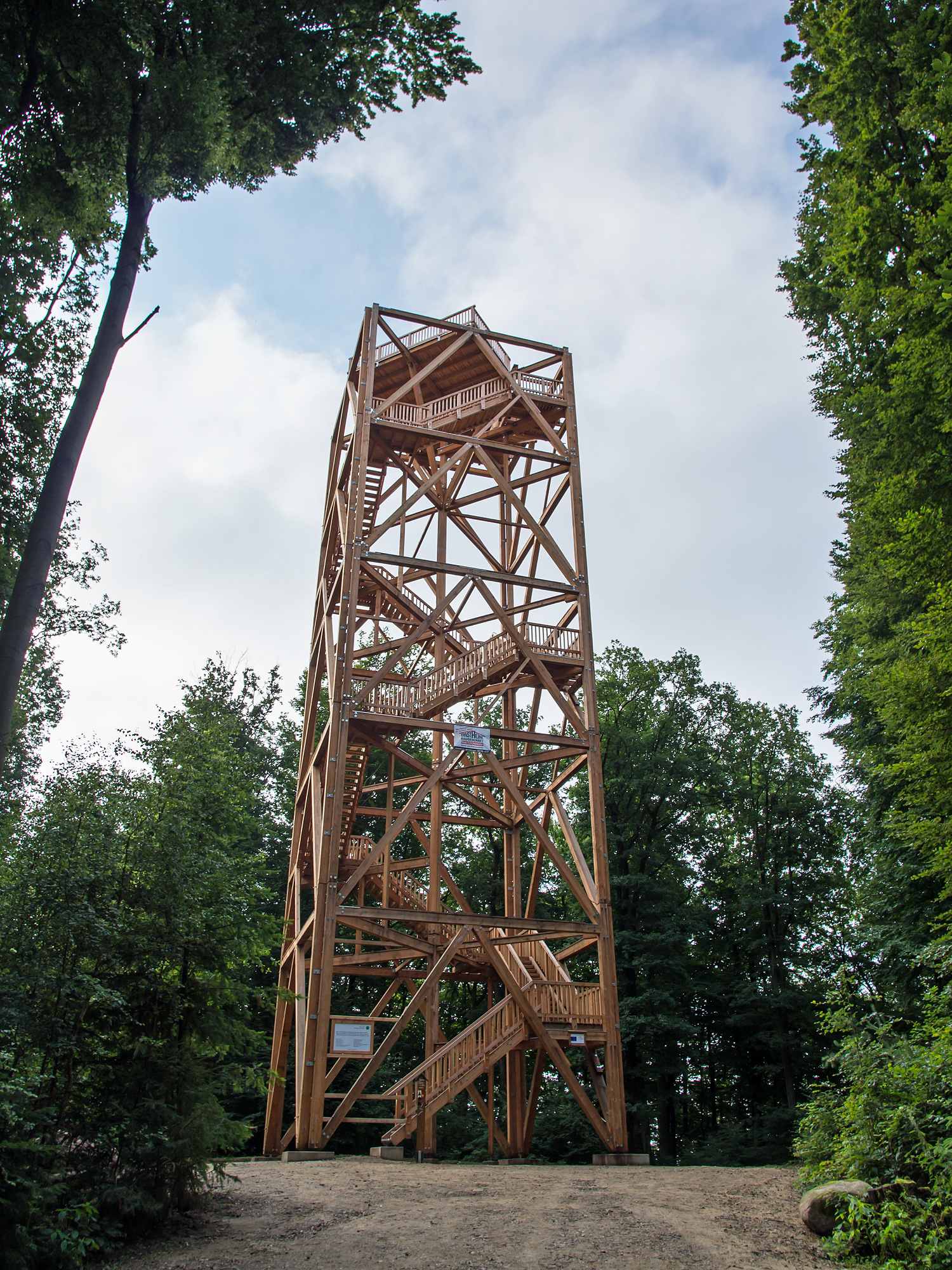
New tower (2015)
