= Battle of the Göhrde =

1813 battle during the War of the Sixth Coalition

- Part of the German campaign of the Sixth Coalition
Date	16 September 1813
Location	near Göhrde in Niedersachsen (Lower Saxony) 53.153°N 10.835°E
Result	Coalition victory

Belligerents
Prussia; Russia; United Kingdom (Province of Hanover) Hanover	France

Commanders and leaders
Ludwig von Wallmoden-Gimborn	Marc Nicolas Louis Pécheux

Strength
12,200; 38 guns	3,080; 6 guns

Casualties and losses
558–1,100	1,500–2,500; 6 guns

War of the Sixth Coalition:
German campaign
current battle
Napoleon in command
Napoleon not in command

The Battle of the Göhrde took place during the War of the Sixth Coalition on 16 September 1813 between French and Coalition troops at Göhrde, Germany. The French troops were defeated and withdrew to Hamburg.

== Site ==
The battle occurred near what is now the Göhrde State Forest (Staatsforst Göhrde), near Dannenberg, near Lüneburg. At that time this area belonged to the electorate of Braunschweig-Lüneburg (Hanover), which had been occupied by the French since 1803.

== Prelude ==
In March 1813, Russian troops under Friedrich Karl von Tettenborn forced the French out of Hamburg and some northern areas of Hanover. In the wake of Prussia's reentry into the war against France, the eastern areas of Hanover also rose against Napoleon. Wallmoden then received overall command of all the Allied troops on the Lower Elbe: troops from Prussia, Russia, the United Kingdom, Hanover, Hamburg, Mecklenburg and Sweden, including the Russian German legion, the Lützow Free Corps, the Hanseatic Legion and a part of the King's German Legion, under the overall command of Generalleutnant Ludwig von Wallmoden-Gimborn. Part of the British contingent was the newly formed Rocket Brigade under Capt Richard Bogue. On 7 September Bogue marched with half his brigade to join the main Army of the North, near Wittenburg. The other half of the brigade, under Lieut Thomas Fox Strangways joined the 4th Cavalry Division of General von Dornberg under General Wallmoden.

The Free Corps such as that from Lützow again and again attacked French supply lines and bases in the area around Mecklenburg, south of the Elbe. The XIII Corps there, under marshal Davout, had up to this point behaved quite passively, restricting itself to holding Wallmoden's corps in check. As an anti-skirmishes measure, in September Davout sent general Pécheux on the western Elbufer with a brigade of 50th infantry division and moved on Lüneburg with 3,000 troops. After completing his mission, Pécheux was ordered to rejoin the French troops in Magdeburg. Wallmoden's corps advanced on Dömitz on 15 September with 12,300 men, crossed the Elbe, marched toward the Frenchmen and set up camp in Dannenberg.

== Battle ==
Attack of 3rd KGL Hussars & Rocket Battery

The French division under Pécheux decided to attack the allies. On the early afternoon of 18 September 1813, it reached the Steinker Höhen (Steinker Heights) in Nahrendorf and gave battle. Whilst Wallmoden's infantry attacked the centre, Dornberg with the KGL cavalry and artillery attacked the enemy's left. However, Dornberg brought the guns and rockets into action at too great a range; their fire was ineffective and General Lyon's infantry attack was held up. The French began to retire, formed in squares, and Strangways advanced to bring the rockets into action "close under the fire of the enemy’s infantry". The 3rd KGL Hussars broke two squares and the rockets spread such terror through the retiring ranks that order could no longer be preserved, and breaking, the French fled in all directions.

== Results ==
The battle was the first victory over the French troops garrisoning Germany, and interrupted the link between XIII Corps under marshal Davout (with its headquarters in Hamburg) and Napoleon's main army (then in Saxony) and the French armies' supply-lines across Hanover from France to Magdeburg and Berlin. This result was critical for the outcome of the Battle of Leipzig soon afterwards. This was the first battle in which the newly developed Congreve Rocket had been successfully deployed in action. At the Battle of Leipzig, The Rocket Brigade, under Bogue and Strangways, would make a significant attack whilst attached to the Swedish Corps of Crown Prince Bernadotte.

== Commemorations ==
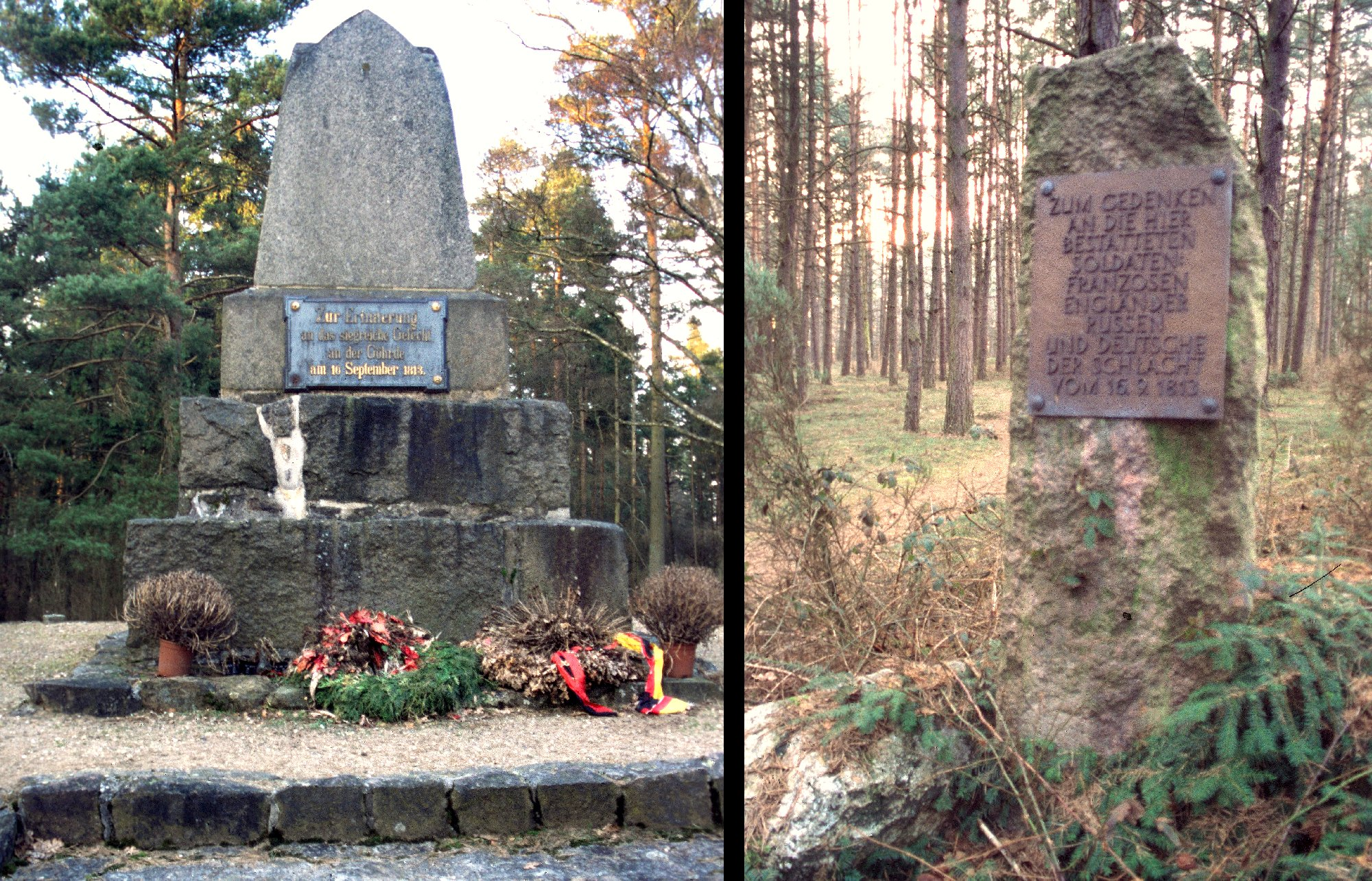
Memorial

A large stone monument stands as a memorial to the battle in 1839, at a site now north of Bundesstraße 216 about 2 km behind Oldendorf in Richtung Dannenberg.

1000 dead soldiers from both sides were buried in a mass grave in the forest, 100m from where the memorial is sited. This grave was rediscovered in 1985.

Rudolf von Bennigsen's father Karl von Bennigsen fought in this battle (as a lieutenant), as did the famous freedom fighter Eleonore Prochaska. She had disguised herself as a man and joined the Lützow Free Corps. During the battle she was wounded and soon afterwards succumbed to her injuries in the hospital at Dannenberg.

A reconstruction of the battle occurs every two years at Dahlenburg. At the Heimatmuseum in the town a diorama of the battle is on permanent display, with 1500 tin soldiers.

== Notes ==
Preceded by Second Battle of Kulm	Napoleonic Wars; Battle of the Göhrde	Succeeded by Combat of Rosslau
