= Elbhöhen-Wendland Nature Park =

Nature park in Lower Saxony, Germany

Coordinates: 53°13′20.93″N 10°59′10.78″E

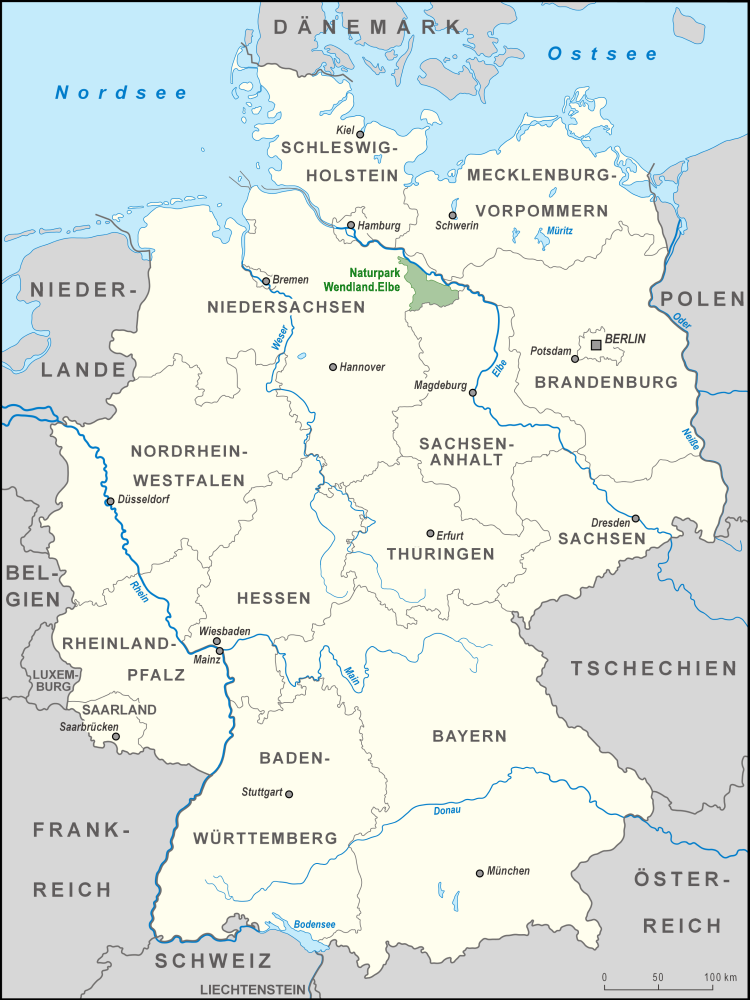
Location of the Elbufer-Drawehn Nature Park

The Elbhöhen-Wendland Nature Park (German: Naturpark Elbhöhen-Wendland), formerly known as the Elbufer-Drawehn Nature Park (Naturpark Elbufer-Drawehn) is a German nature park east of Lüneburg in Lower Saxony.

== Geography ==
=== Location ===
The nature park lies mainly in Lüchow-Dannenberg and, after being extended in 2006, covers the majority of this rural district. It has an area of about 1,160 square kilometres (450 sq mi) and belongs to some of the most sparsely populated areas in Germany. The park originally included two very different geographical regions from which it derived its name:

- the ridge of Drawehn in western Lüchow-Dannenberg
- the banks of the Elbe River (German: Elbufer) in northern Lüchow-Dannenberg and partly in Lüneburg district

Both landscapes were formed by the ice age. The Drawehn is an end moraine from the penultimate glaciation - a heap of rock debris pushed by the ice sheet and left behind at the end of the glacier. The Elbe valley by contrast was a meltwater channel from the last ice age.

== History ==
The park was founded in 1968. It is part of the Elbe River Landscape (Flusslandschaft Elbe), which was designated as a biosphere reserve by UNESCO in 1997 and overlaps with the Lower Saxon Elbe Water Meadows Biosphere Reserve (Niedersächsische Elbtalaue Biosphärenreservat). On 1 June 2006 the protected area of the nature park was increased to 115.994 hectares (286.63 acres), almost double its previous size. In Germany the mere designation of an area as a nature park does not make it a strict nature conservation area, but is first and foremost to promote tourism.

== Flora and fauna ==
The vegetation of the nature park varies depending on the relief and soil composition. The higher, sandy podsol soils supported extensive areas of heath until the 18th century. Today, following afforestation, they are covered by large pine forests. On clayey soils there are the remnants of a natural deciduous forest vegetation, especially in the Göhrde. The better soils have been turned into arable fields.

The banks of the Elbe are under special protection as breeding, stopover and winter sites on the bird migration routes between Siberia and Africa. During the summer months more than 150 species of bird breed here and white and black storks, cranes, herons and white-tailed eagles can be seen. In autumn and winter migrating cranes, ducks, geese and swans may be observed. The lower Middle Elbe basin with its rich water meadow is also of outstanding important for amphibians such as the European fire-bellied toad, the European tree frog and the moor frog.

== See also ==
- List of nature parks in Germany
