= Marc Nicolas Louis Pécheux =

French general (1769–1831)

Marc Nicolas Louis Pécheux (born 28 January 1769 in Bucilly (Aisne) – 1 December 1831 in Paris), was a French general during the Napoleonic Wars.

Pécheux fought and lost the Battle of the Göhrde in 1813. During the Hundred Days, Pécheux commanded the 12th Infantry Division and fought in the battles of Ligny and Wavre.
