= Göhrde Hunting Lodge =

Hunting lodge of the Hanoverian electors and German emperors in Lower Saxony

Coordinates: 53°08′26″N 10°52′36″E

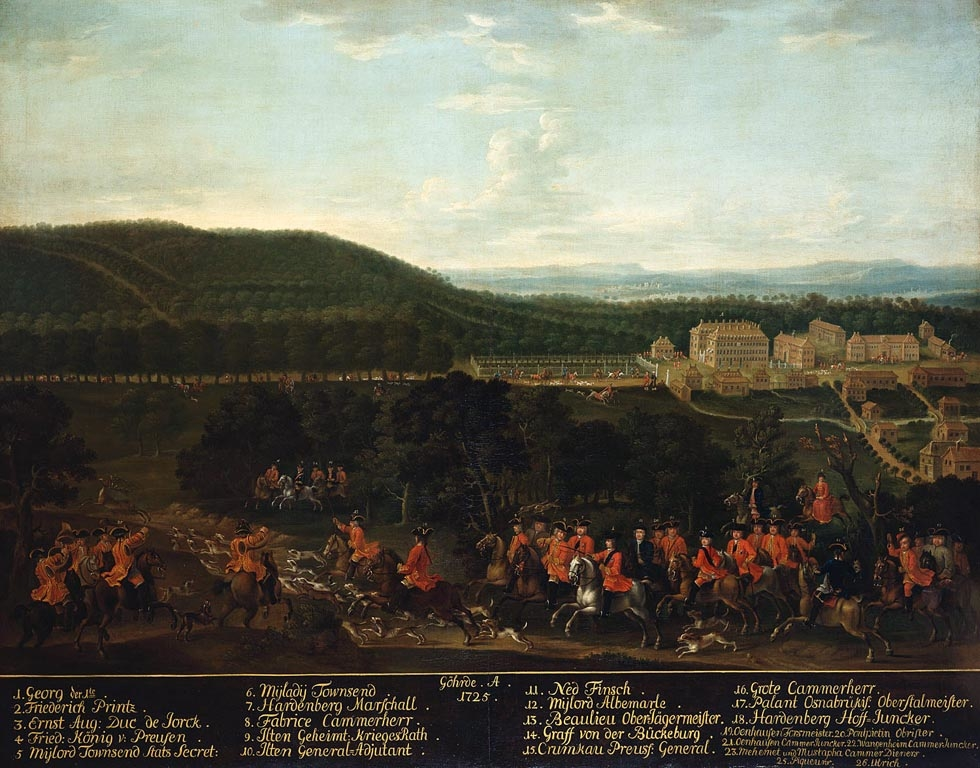
A royal hunting party at Göhrde (Royal Collection)

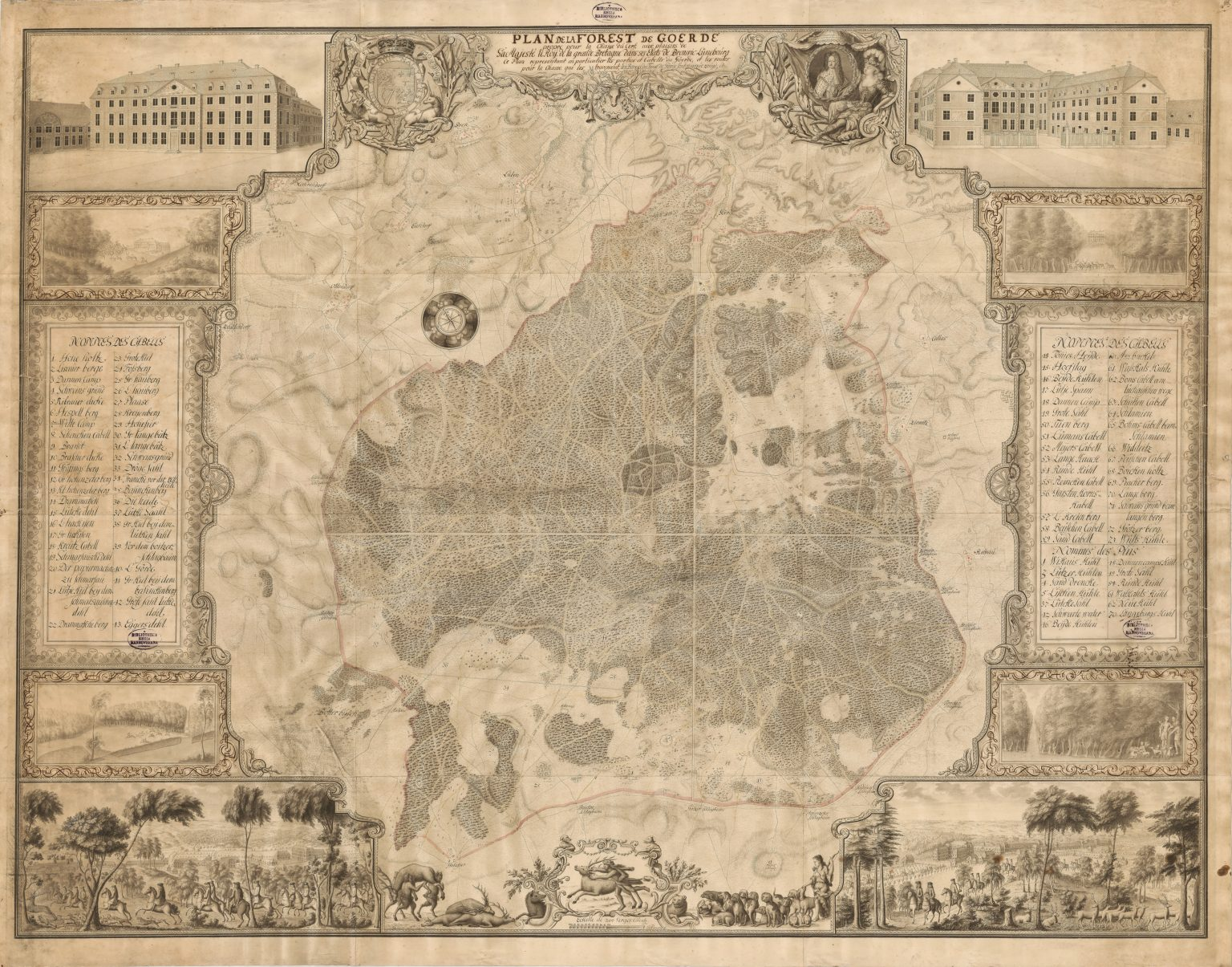
Plan of the Göhrde forest in 1715

The Göhrde hunting lodge (German: Jagdschloss Göhrde) is a former hunting lodge in Göhrde, Lower Saxony in Germany. The Göhrde State Forest was once a favourite hunting ground of the dukes of Brunswick-Lüneburg. Later the kings of Hannover also hunted here and – to 1918 – the German emperors as well.

As Elector of Hanover, king George I of Great Britain (1660–1727) built a baroque style palace here between 1706 and 1709 by the architects Louis Remy de la Fosse and Johann Christian Böhm. The palace was timber framed and in bad repair by the early 19th century. In 1827, it was taken down. The German Emperors redeveloped the former stables in a new hunting lodge.

After the First World War, the hunting lodge served as a seminary and school. Today, it is privately owned and in poor condition. Almost nothing remains of the 18th-century splendour.

== History ==
=== Royal hunting lodge for King George I ===
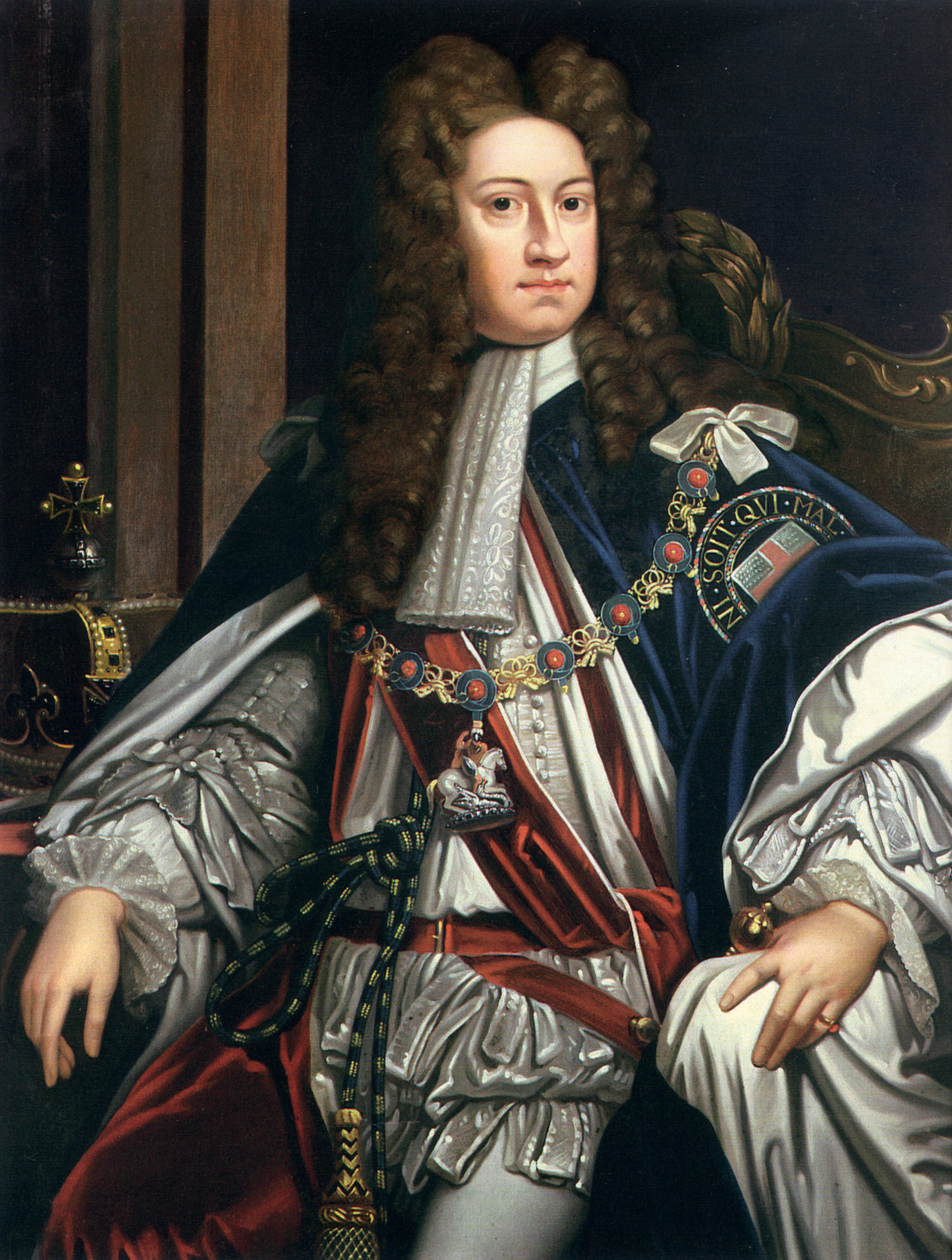
King George I

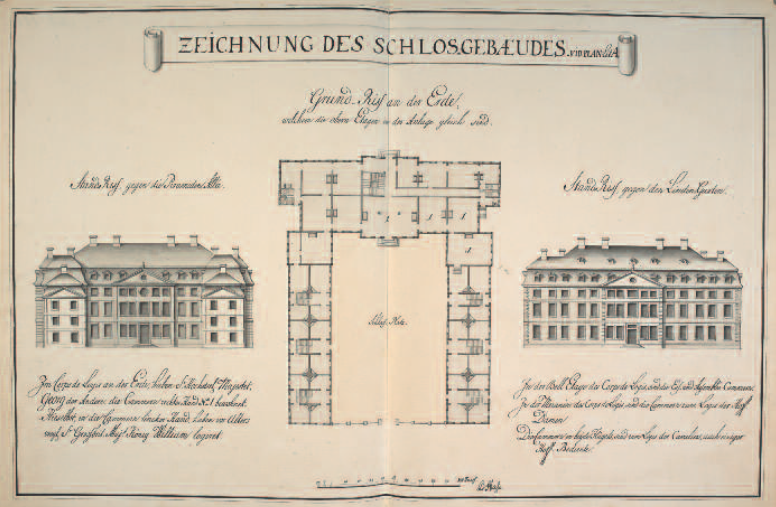
Floor plan of the Göhrde palace and two facades by Benjamin Hase in 1759

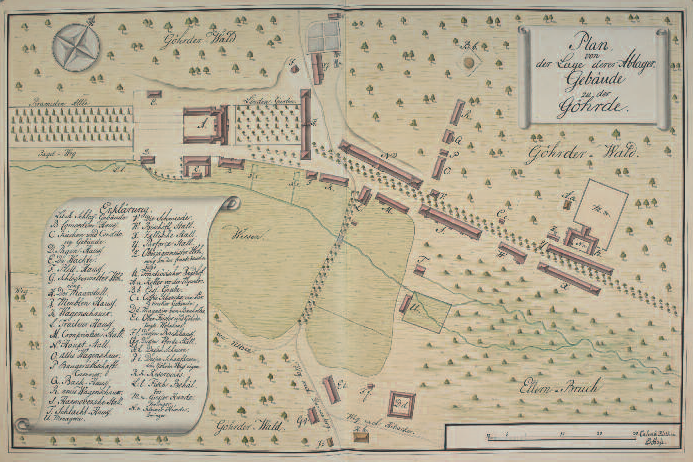
Plan of the Göhrde palace and its direct surroundings in 1759

The Göhrde forests are located near the Elbe river between Lüneburg and Dannenberg. The forests were a favourite hunting ground of the dukes of Brunswick-Lüneburg, and later Electors of Hanover. Already as of 16th century, there was a hunting lodge.

King George I was a passionate hunter. It was said that he ‘had no other pleasure but the hunt’. In 1706, he decided to expand the existing infrastructure: the existing lodge was to be replaced by a new palace. In addition, various new outbuildings were added as well, such as new stables, a theatre, a bakery and an abattoir. Construction costed 83,000 talers and it was the king's most elaborate and major construction project.

The palace designs were made by the court architect Louis Remy de la Fosse, with assistance of Johann Christian Böhm. Construction started in 1706 and was completed in 1710. The palace was a compact three story building and slightly lower side wings, which contained at least 48 apartments to accommodate guests. Ancestral portraits from Henry the Lion (1129/1131-1195) onwards decorated the palace walls. The royal stables could house more than 500 horses. In addition, there were also dog kennels.

The hunting lodge in Göhrde was the scene of large ‘par force’ hunts. These were grand theatrical events, meticulously planned to demonstrate power and greatness. King George I and his guests participated in the hunt, or positioned themselves centrally in the forest while they waited to be summoned. Meanwhile, the mounted hunters and their hounds pursued the day's quarry. From their waiting place, the king and his guests could watch the hunters, horses and hounds as they persecuted the frantic stag at great speed. When the exhausted stag was no longer able to run, the dogs held it fast by biting its throat, ears, legs and muzzle. Thus, the stag was “fixed” and the king was summoned with a special horn signal. He carried out his duty as the master of the hunt by killing the stag with a stab wound to the heart.

With the accession of king George to the throne of the United Kingdom in 1714, the Personal union of Great Britain and Hanover started. The king relocated to London and the large hunting parties in Göhrde were reduced to a few events, but they were still there. The king liked to go from time to time to Hanover. In 1725, king George I entertained king Frederick William I of Prussia (1688–1740) at Göhrde.

==== Gallery: The Göhrde palace in the time of King George I – around 1715 ====
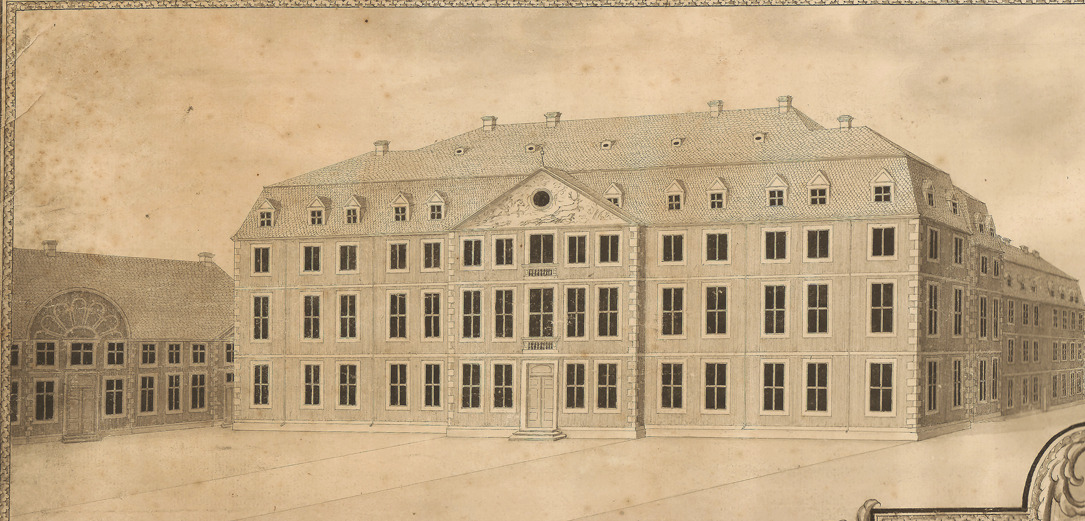
The palace from the northeast

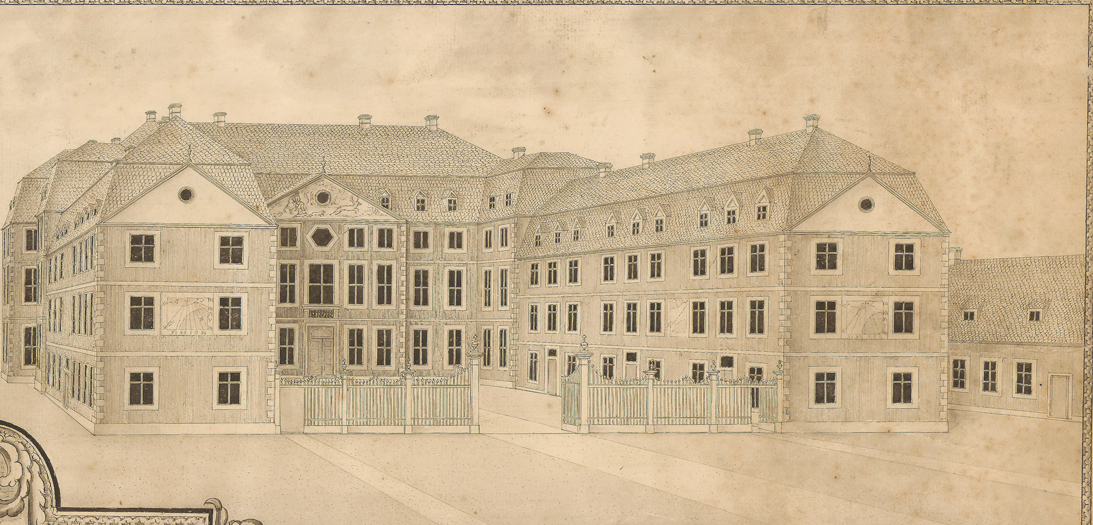
The palace from the southwest

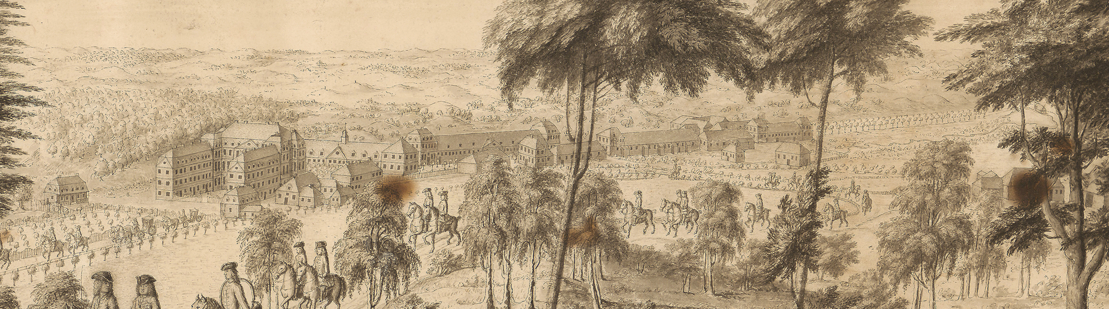
The palace from the southeast

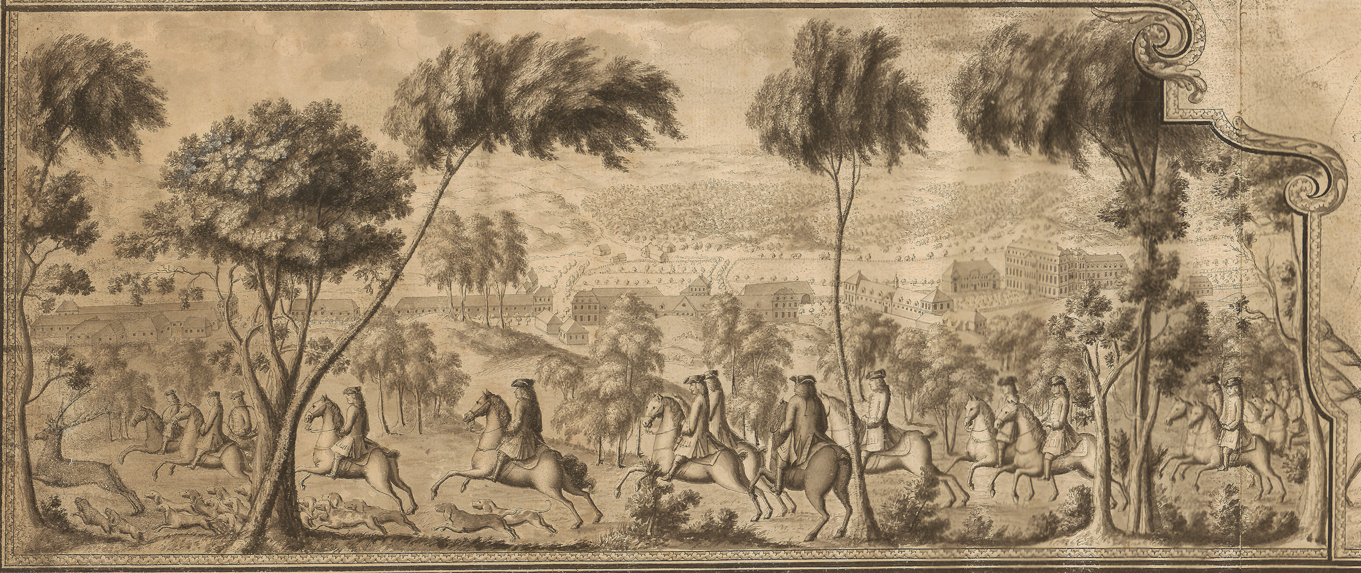
The palace from the northwest

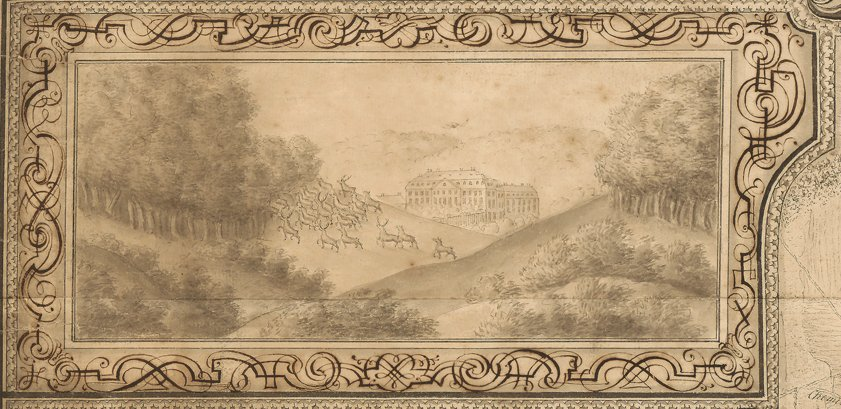
Deer with the palace in the back

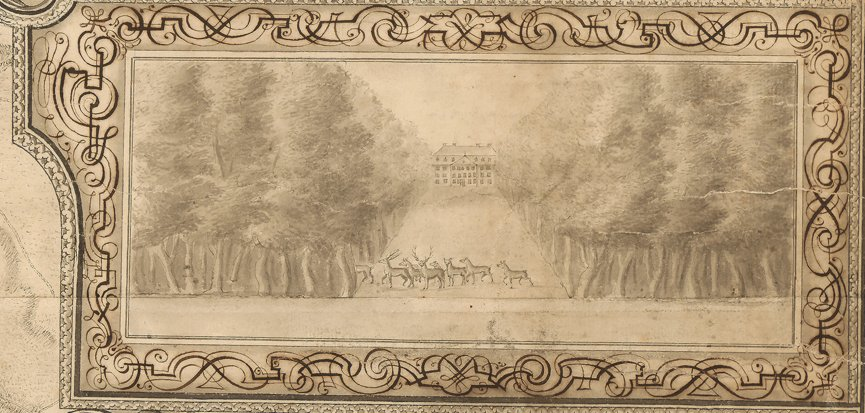
Deer with the palace in the back

=== Second half of the 18th century ===
Between 1756 and 1765, Benjamin Hase drew various site plans of the palace complex, which are preserved in the British Map Library. Although Göhrde remained a royal hunting property from 1766 onwards, it was no longer used for hunting when king George III (1738–1820) ordered the hunting rights in Göhrde to be leased, but no lessee was found. The palace also remained unused and was left to decay.

In 1772, the exiled Danish queen Caroline Matilda (1751–1775) used the castle as a temporary residence before moving into Celle Castle, where she died only 23 years old.

=== 19th century ===
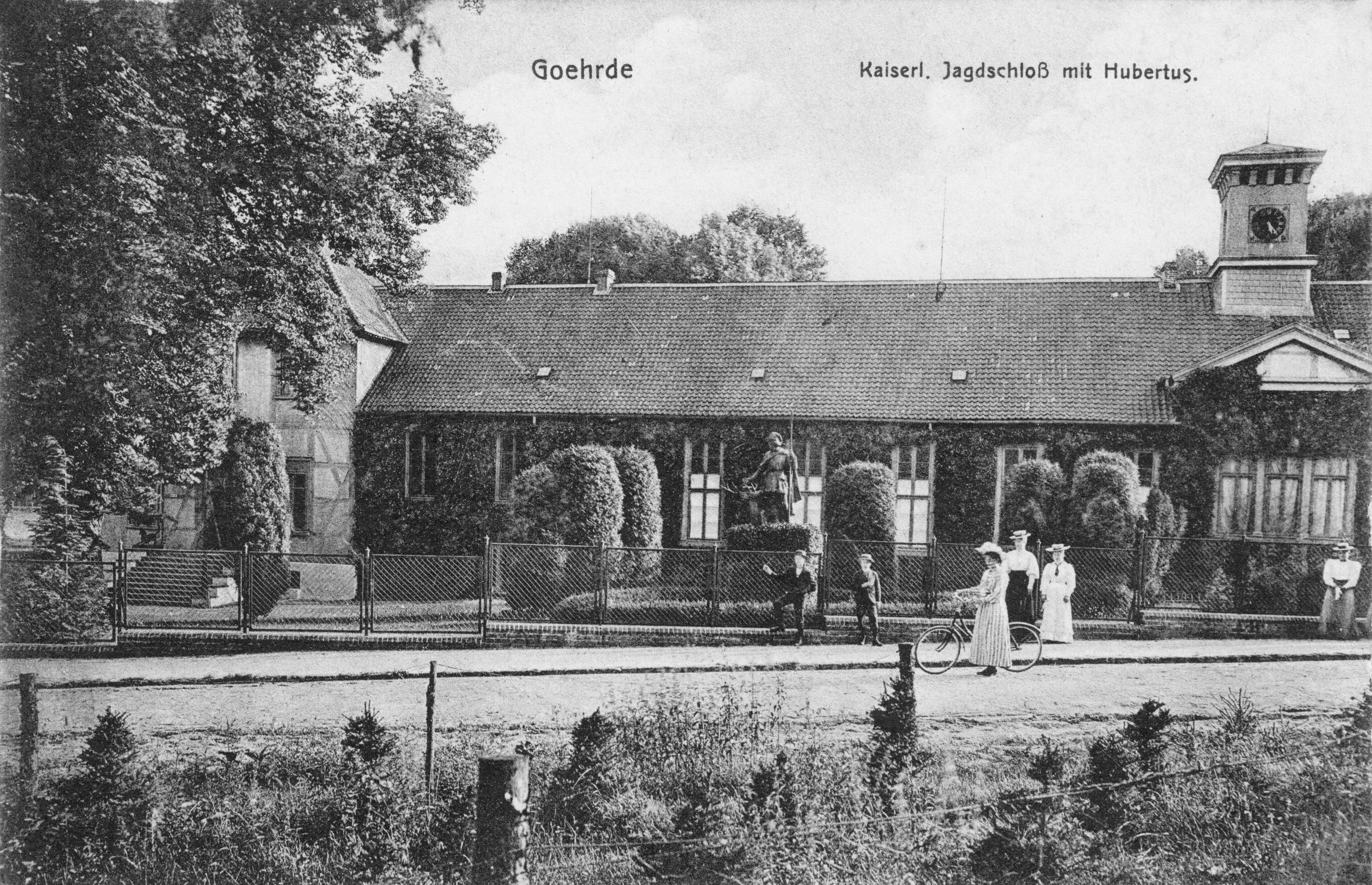
The imperial hunting lodge around 1910

The timber framed palace was in bad repair by the early 19th century. In 1827, king George IV (1762–1830) decided to take down the palace. The salvageable material was auctioned off, covering about 10 percent of the original construction cost. Only the large royal stable and a Cavalier house were repaired to serve occasional hunting purposes.

It was not until the return of a new king to Hanover, Ernest Augustus (1771–1851), in 1837 that the place revived. Ownership of the property passed to the German emperor William I (1797–1888) in 1866, who carried out some major renovations and expansions. The former stables were turned into a new hunting lodge, which could serve as a new centre of hunting parties.

The last major imperial hunt took place here in 1913 with a large party attended by emperor Wilhelm II (1859–1941).

=== 20th century ===
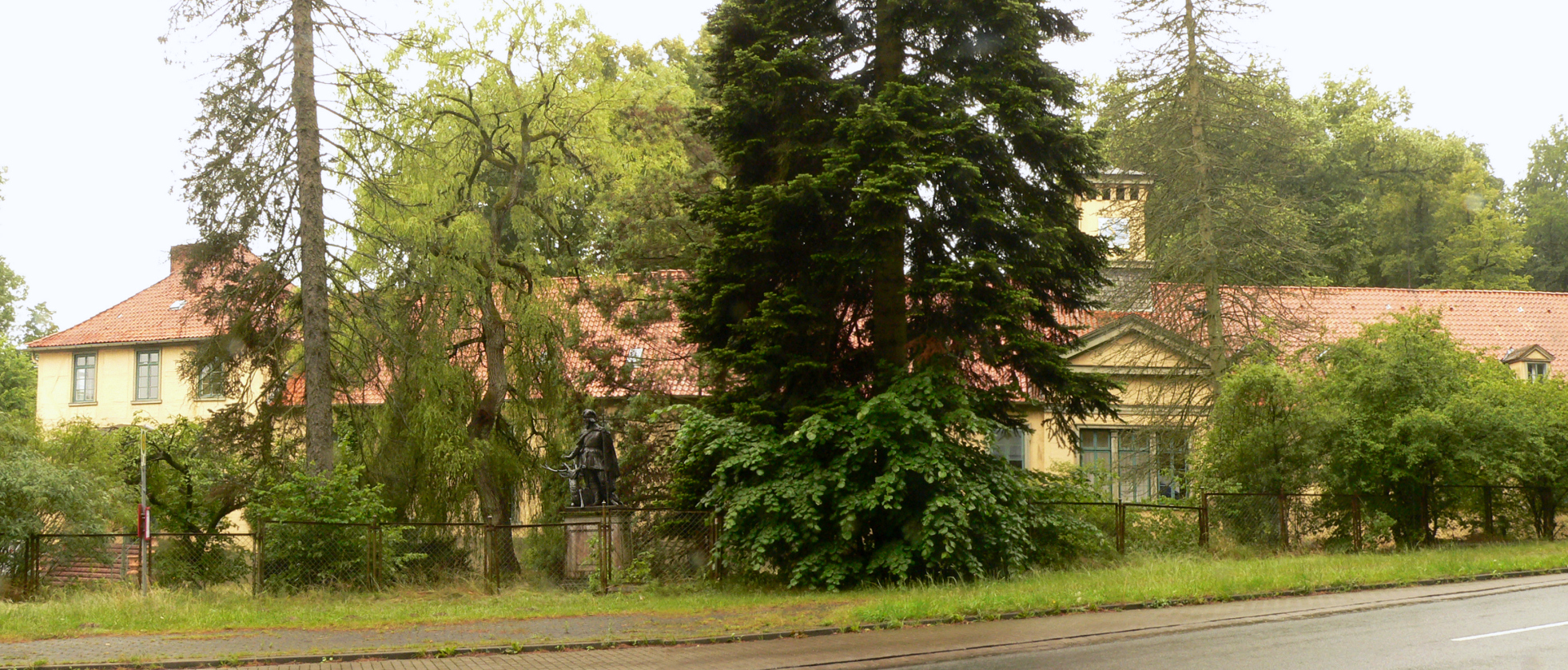
The hunting lodge in 2015

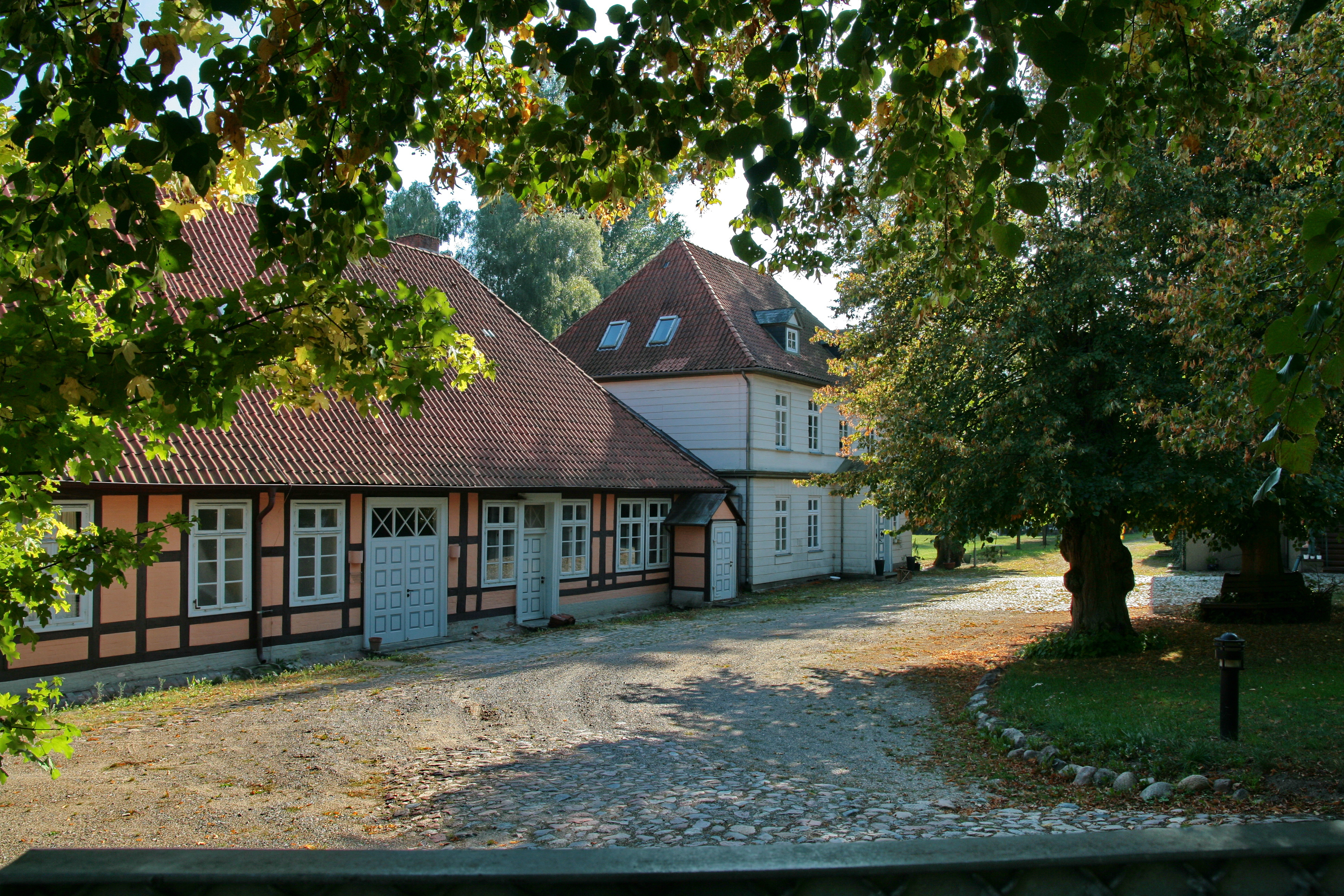
Outbuildings with the white princes house

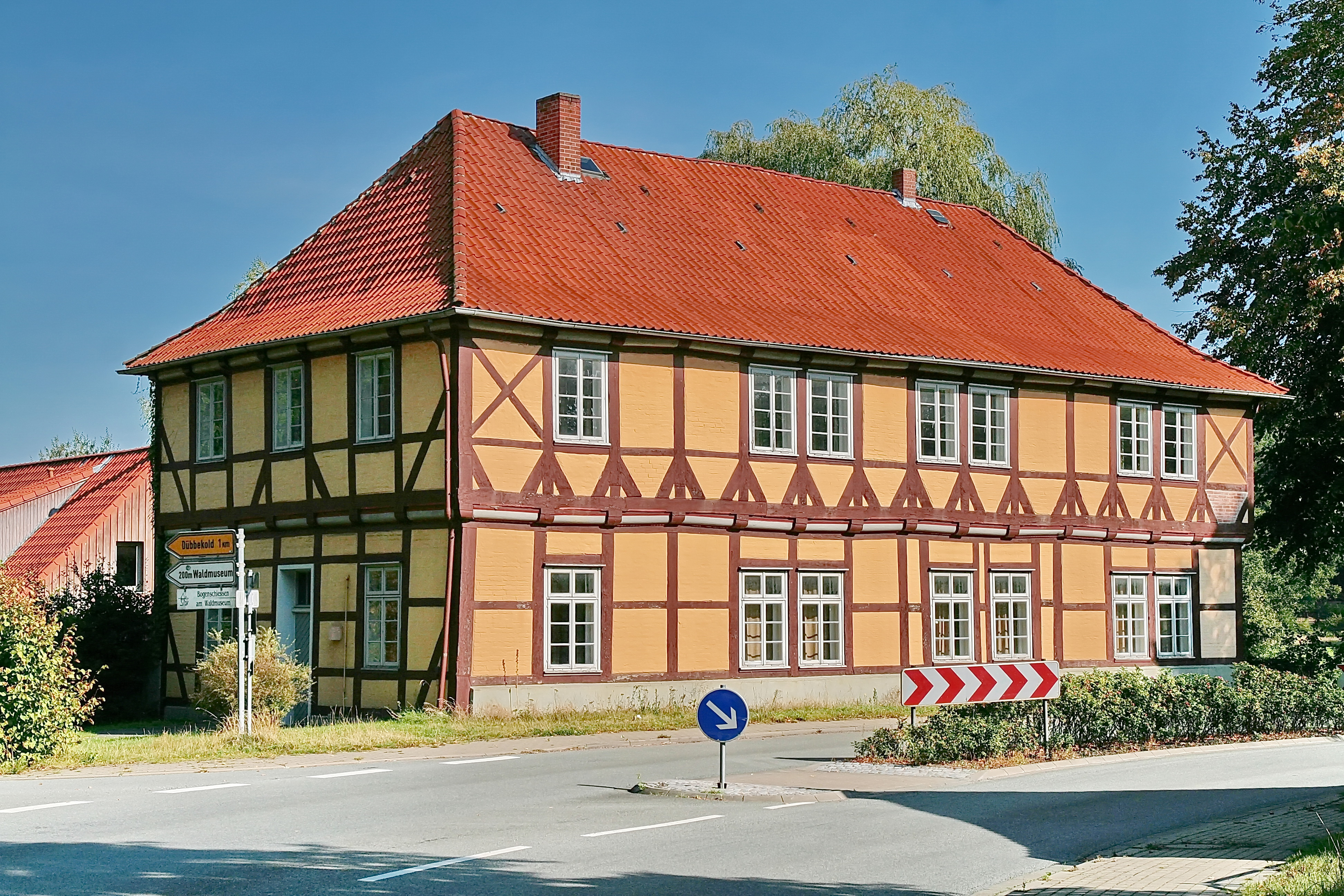
The house of the court cook, constructed in 1682

After the First World War, the palace served as a recreation home for civil servants, and from 1929 as a seminary for vicars of the Hanoverian State Church. In 1939, the contract with the State Church was terminated; the church should no longer benefit from state institutions. Thus, the vicars had to move to the existing seminary in Loccum in 1940.

The hunting lodge was now intended to be used as a National Socialist educational institution for female teachers. This did not happen, and after 1946, the building became an educational centre (German: Heimvolkshochschule Jagdschloss Göhrde). Among other events, the 23rd meeting of Group 47 took place here in October 1961 with the author and poet Hans Magnus Enzensberger as the speaker.

=== Modern times ===
In 1997, the Lüneburg (region) declared the hunting lodge as state-owned property dispensable, which was confirmed by the Lower Saxony Ministry of Science and Culture. Due to reasons of prudent financial management, the sale of the property, which was in need of renovation, became necessary. After years without a buyer, the listed castle complex was sold at the end of 2005 to private owner for 30,000 euros. This also transferred the obligation to preserve the castle as a cultural monument, as contained in the Lower Saxony Monument Protection Act, to the buyer. After the sale, there was a dispute over the use due to unclear ownership.

Today, it is privately owned and in poor condition and deteriorating. During winter, the buildings are not heated, due to cost saving reasons. The owner does not allow local authorities and conservationists to enter the property, so they are not able to assess what the current status is.
