= Nahrendorf =

- Municipality
- Location of Nahrendorf within Lüneburg district
- Interactive map of Nahrendorf
- Location within Germany Location within Lower Saxony
- Coordinates: 53°11′N 10°49′E
- Country: Germany
- State: Lower Saxony
- District: Lüneburg
- Municipal assoc.: Dahlenburg

Government
  - Mayor: Uwe Meyer

Area
  - Total: 44.04 km^{2} (17.00 sq mi)
- Elevation: 72 m (236 ft)

Population (2025-12-31)
  - Total: 1,096
  - Density: 24.89/km^{2} (64.46/sq mi)
- Time zone: UTC+01:00 (CET)
  - Summer (DST): UTC+02:00 (CEST)
- Postal codes: 21369
- Dialling codes: 05851, 05853, 05855
- Vehicle registration: LG

Nahrendorf is a municipality in the district of Lüneburg, in Lower Saxony, Germany.
