= Göhrde =

- Municipality
- Location of Göhrde within Lüchow-Dannenberg district
- Interactive map of Göhrde
- Location within Germany Location within Lower Saxony
- Coordinates: 53°09′N 10°53′E
- Country: Germany
- State: Lower Saxony
- District: Lüchow-Dannenberg
- Municipal assoc.: Elbtalaue
- Subdivisions: 12 Ortsteile

Government
  - Mayor: Dietmar Harlfinger (FDP)

Area
  - Total: 40.75 km^{2} (15.73 sq mi)
- Elevation: 77 m (253 ft)

Population (2025-12-31)
  - Total: 568
  - Density: 13.9/km^{2} (36.1/sq mi)
- Time zone: UTC+01:00 (CET)
  - Summer (DST): UTC+02:00 (CEST)
- Postal codes: 29473
- Dialling codes: 05862
- Vehicle registration: DAN

Göhrde (German pronunciation: [ˈɡøːɐ̯də]) is a municipality in the district of Lüchow-Dannenberg, in Lower Saxony, Germany.

The municipality was named after the Göhrde State Forest, which has an area of about 75 square kilometres (29 sq mi), famous for its oaks, beeches and game preserves. The Göhrde Hunting Lodge situated in the forest was built in 1689 and was restored by Ernest Augustus, King of Hanover. It is known to history on account of the constitution of Gohrde, promulgated here in 1719.

It is also notable for the Battle of the Göhrde on 16 September 1813 during the War of the Sixth Coalition, in which Allied forces under Wallmoden defeated the French forces commanded by Pécheux.
