= Ilmenau (Samtgemeinde) =

- Samtgemeinde
- Coat of arms

- Location of Ilmenau within Lüneburg district
- Interactive map of Ilmenau
- Location within Germany Location within Lower Saxony
- Coordinates: 53°11′N 10°24′E
- Country: Germany
- State: Lower Saxony
- District: Lüneburg
- Subdivisions: 4 districts

Government
  - Mayor (2021–26): Peter Rowohlt (SPD)

Area
  - Total: 69.70 km^{2} (26.91 sq mi)

Population (2025-12-31)
  - Total: 10,465
  - Density: 150.1/km^{2} (388.9/sq mi)
- Time zone: UTC+01:00 (CET)
  - Summer (DST): UTC+02:00 (CEST)
- Postal codes: 21406, 21407, 21409
- Dialling codes: 04131, 04134
- Vehicle registration: LG
- Website: www.samtgemeinde-ilmenau.de

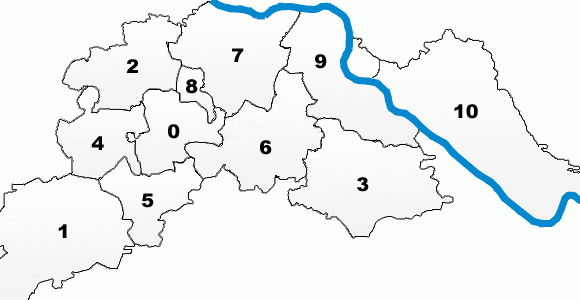
Map of the district of Lüneburg 1 = "Collective Municipality" Amelinghausen 2 = "Collective Municipality" Bardowick 3 = "Collective Municipality" Dahlenburg 4 = "Collective Municipality" Gellersen 5 = "Collective Municipality" Ilmenau 6 = "Collective Municipality" Ostheide 7 = "Collective Municipality" Scharnebeck 8 = Municipality Adendorf 9 = Bleckede 10 = Municipality Amt Neuhaus blue = River Elbe

Ilmenau is a Samtgemeinde ("collective municipality") in the district of Lüneburg, in Lower Saxony, Germany. It is situated along the river Ilmenau (hence the name), approx. 8 km south of Lüneburg. Its seat is in the village Melbeck.

== Division of the municipality ==
The Samtgemeinde Ilmenau consists of the following municipalities:

1. Barnstedt
2. Deutsch Evern
3. Embsen
4. Melbeck
