= Neetze (river) =

River in Germany

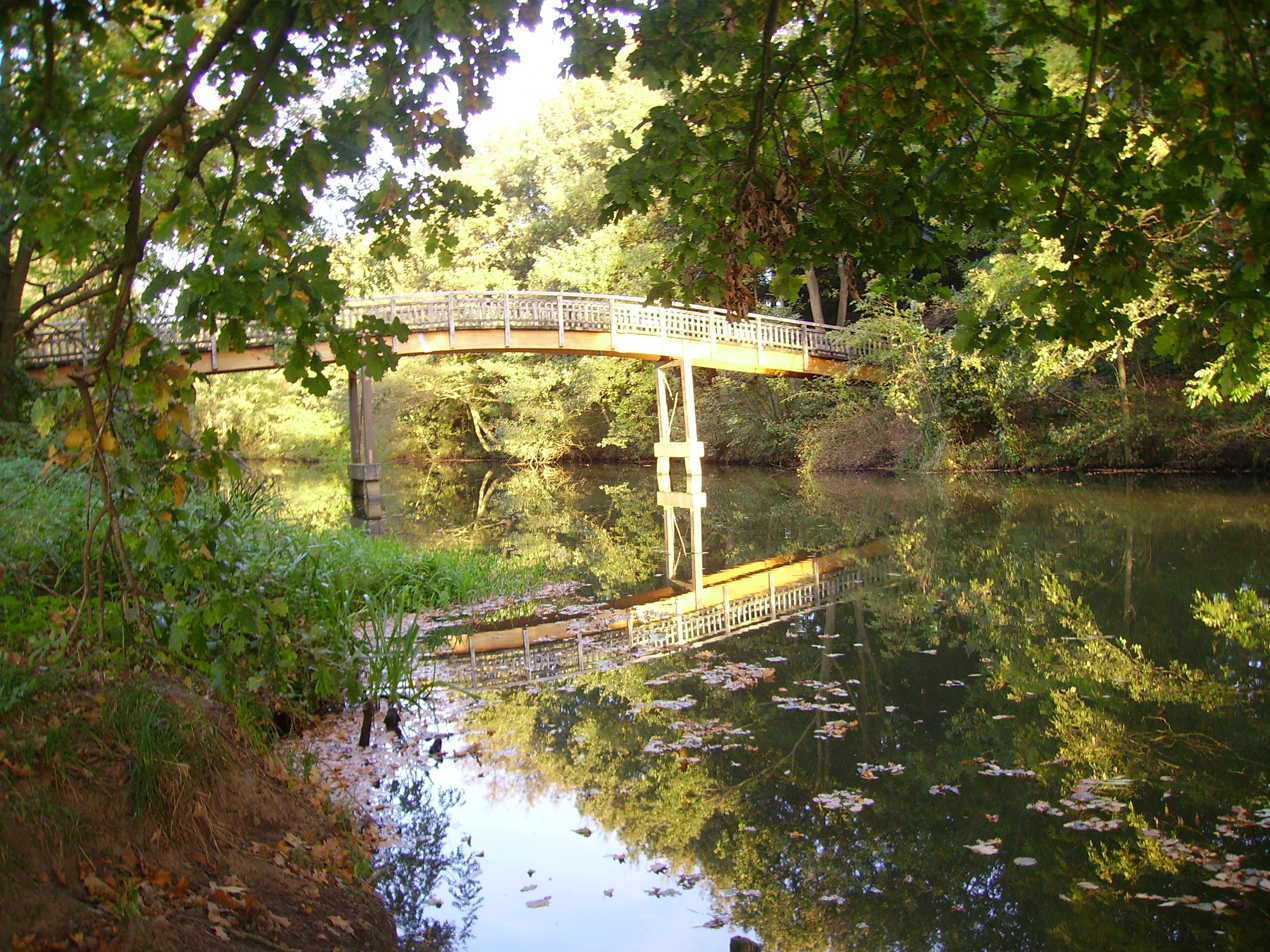

Location
- Country: Germany
- State: Lower Saxony

Physical characteristics
- Source
  - location: Göhrde State Forest
  - coordinates: 53°09′58″N 10°47′27″E
  - elevation: 48 m above sea level (NN)
- Mouth
  - location: near Winsen (Luhe) into the Ilmenau
  - coordinates: 53°21′40″N 10°18′23″E
  - elevation: 2 m above sea level (NN)
- Length: 41.8 km (26.0 mi)
- Basin size: 244 km^{2} (94 sq mi)

Basin features
- Progression: Ilmenau→ Elbe→ North Sea
- Landmarks: Large towns: Winsen (Luhe); Villages: Dahlenburg, Ellringen, Thomasburg, Süttorf, Neetze, Neumühlen, Lüdershausen, Barum, Oldershausen
- Tributaries
  - left: Kalberlah, Mausetalbach, Sankt Vitusbach, Strangengraben
  - right: Harmsdorfer Bach, Bruchwetter, Marschwetter
- Waterbodies: Lakes: Reihersee, Barumer See

Neetze (German pronunciation: [ˈneːtsə]) is a river of Lower Saxony, Germany. It is a left tributary of the Ilmenau. It has a length of approximately 42 km (26 mi) and possesses several side arms.

== See also ==
- List of rivers of Lower Saxony
