= Elbe Lateral Canal =

Canal in Lower Saxony, Germany

Coordinates: 52°25′N 10°38′E

Specifications
- Length: 115 km (71 mi)

History
- Construction began: 1968
- Date completed: 1976

Geography
- Start point: Mittelland Canal near Gifhorn, Germany
- End point: Elbe at Artlenburg, Germany

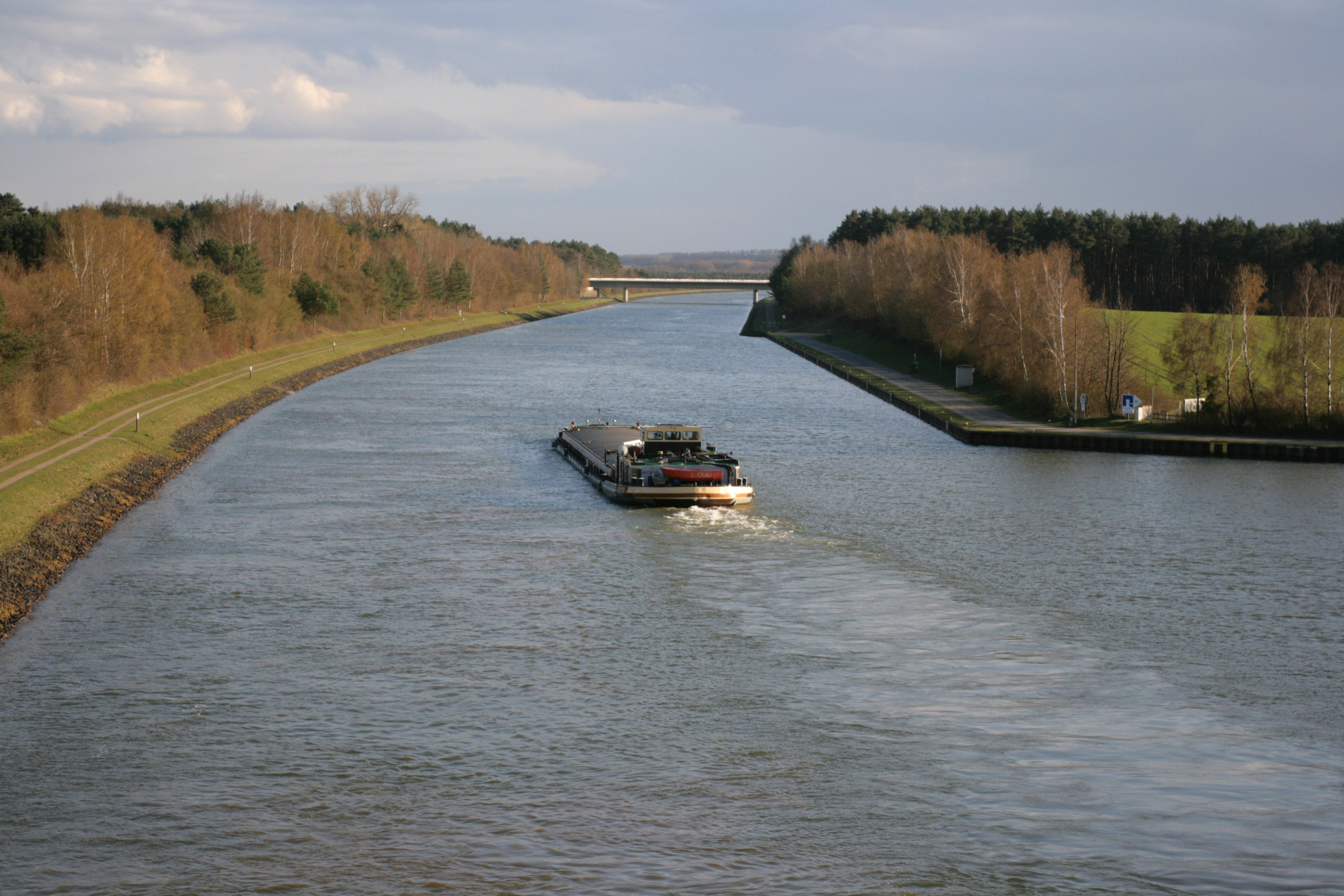
The Elbe Lateral Canal in Bad Bevensen

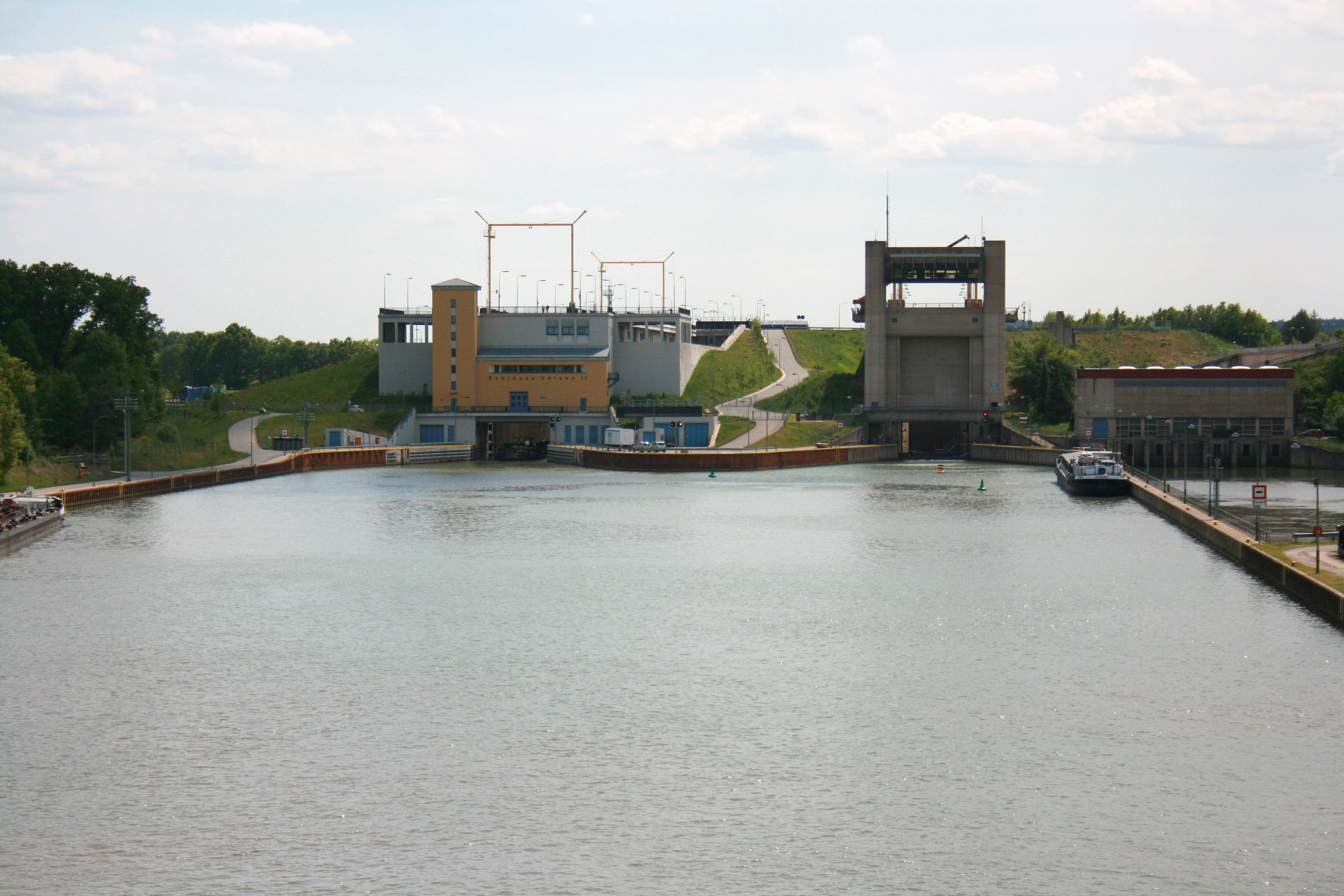
Locks on the Elbe Lateral Canal at Uelzen

The Elbe Lateral Canal (German: Elbe-Seitenkanal; German pronunciation), is a 115-kilometre (71 mi) long canal in Lower Saxony, Germany. It runs from the Mittelland Canal near Gifhorn to the Elbe in Artlenburg. It forms an important transport connection between southern and northern Germany, and it provides a bypass of a section of the Elbe with limited navigability. At the construction start it was also thought as a bypass outside the GDR, considered politically unreliable.

Construction of the Elbe Lateral Canal was started in 1968, and the canal was opened in June 1976. Due to a dam rupture, it was closed from July 1976 until June 1977. The difference in elevation between the Mittelland Canal and the Elbe is 61 metres (200 ft), which is overcome by a 23-metre (75 ft) lock at Uelzen and the Scharnebeck twin ship lift, a 38-metre (125 ft) boat lift at Scharnebeck. There are small ports along the canal in Lüneburg, Uelzen and Wittingen, and a landing stage at Wulfstorf (near Bienenbüttel).

== Cities and villages on Elbe Lateral Canal ==
From south to north:

- Samtgemeinde Isenbüttel
- Samtgemeinde Boldecker Land
- Sassenburg
- Samtgemeinde Hankensbüttel
- Schönewörde
- Wittingen
- Samtgemeinde Aue
- Uelzen
- Bad Bevensen
- Bienenbüttel
- Wendisch Evern
- Lüneburg
- Scharnebeck
- Adendorf
- Artlenburg
