= Scharnebeck twin ship lift =

Coordinates: 53°17′32″N 10°29′18″E

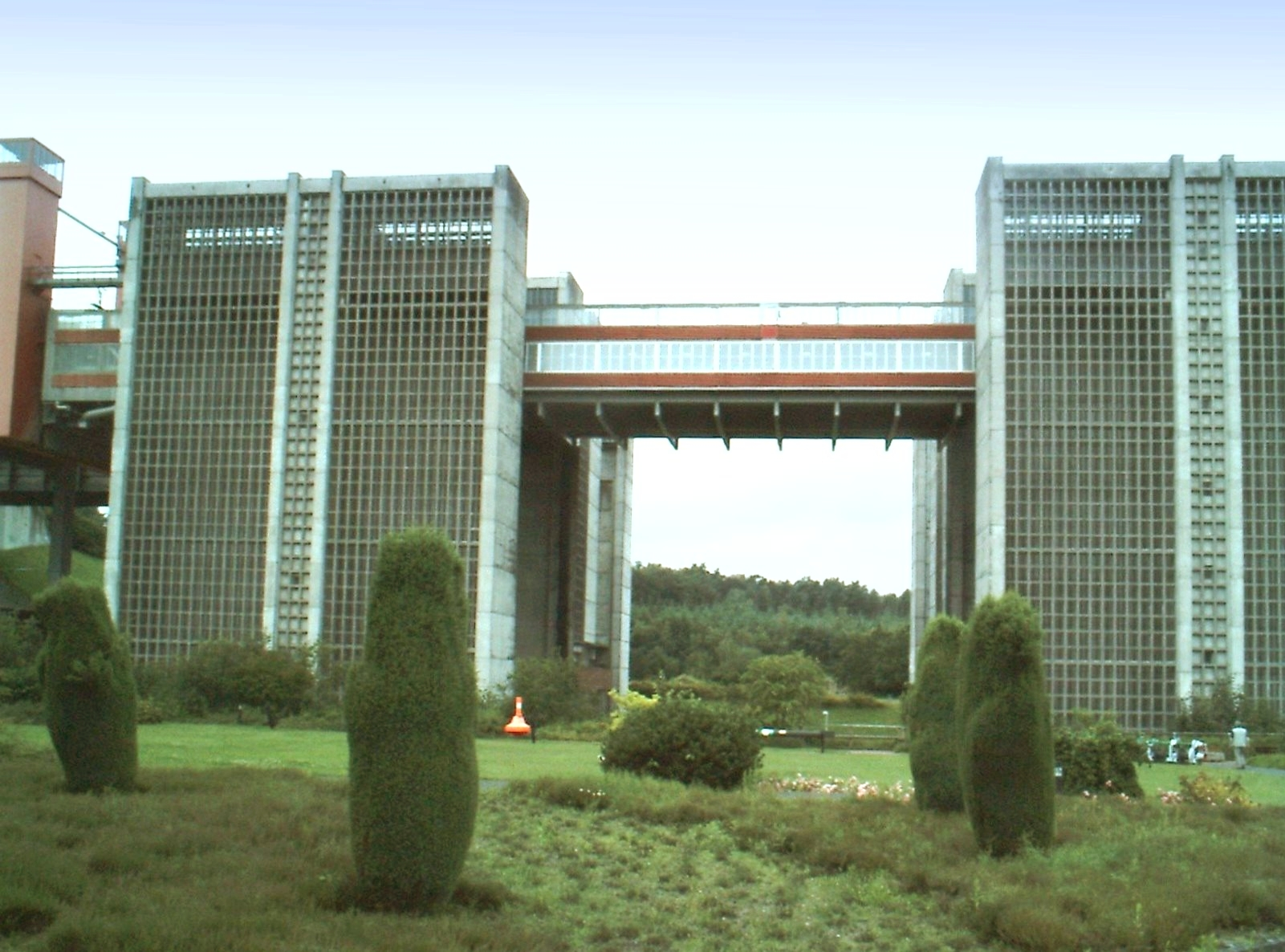
Both troughs up

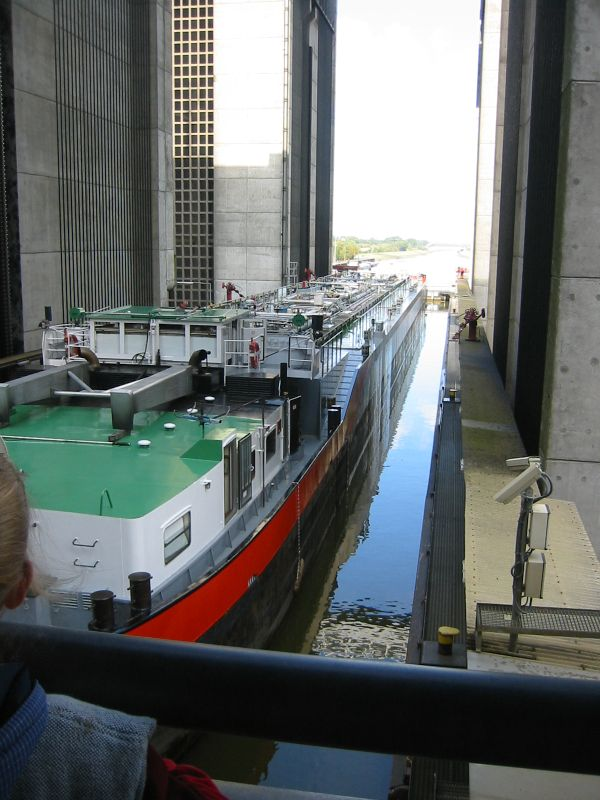
A ship in the lift

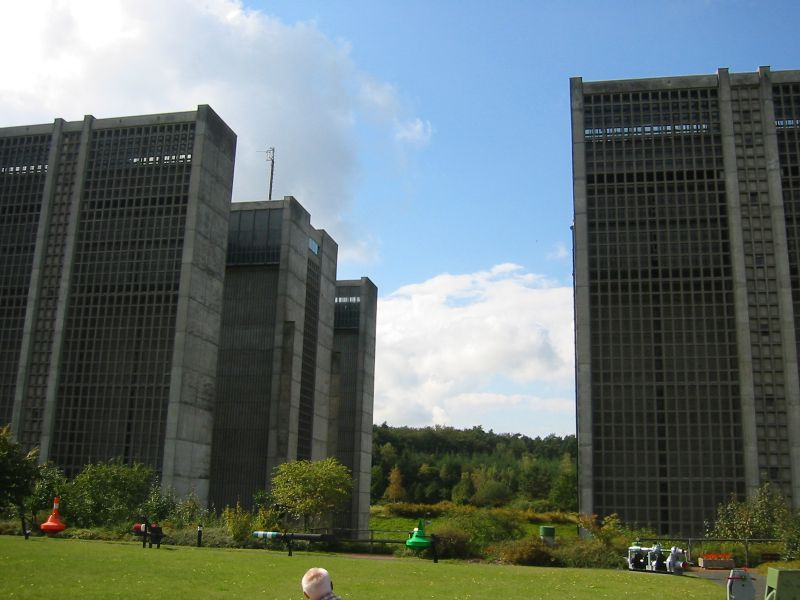
Both troughs down

The Scharnebeck twin ship lift is a 38-metre (125 ft) boat lift in Scharnebeck, northeast of Lüneburg, in the District of Lüneburg, Lower Saxony, Germany. It is on the Elbe Lateral Canal, which connects the Elbe (northern and lower endpoint, at Artlenburg) and the Mittellandkanal (southern and upper endpoint, near Wolfsburg), and is one of two constructions on the canal that overcomes the height difference between the canal endpoints, the other being a 23-metre (75 ft) lock further south at Uelzen.

The Scharnebeck twin ship lift was built in 1974 and was at that time the largest ship lift in the world. The first ship passed through the lift on 5 December 1975. There is a museum at the site.

== Technical data ==
- Design: double counterweight lift
- Construction cost: 152 million Deutsche Mark
- Vertical lift: max. 38 m (125 ft) (depending on the water level of the Elbe)
- Trough size: usable length x usable width x water depth 105 m × 12 m × 3.38 m (344.5 ft × 39.4 ft × 11.1 ft)
- Gate safety: The catch ropes at the trough gates reduce the usable length of the trough by 5 m (16 ft).
- Total weight of the trough filled with water: 5,800 t (5,700 long tons; 6,400 short tons)
- Total moving weight of a trough, the water contained, and associated parts: approx. 11,800 t (11,600 long tons; 13,000 short tons)
- Weight of one counterweight of which there are 224 per trough: approx. 26.5 t (26.1 long tons; 29.2 short tons), giving a total of 5,936 t (5,842 long tons; 6,543 short tons) per trough
- Dimensions of one counterweight: 6.8 m × 3.4 m × 0.32 m (22.3 ft × 11.2 ft × 1.0 ft)
- Thickness of the steel cables: 54 mm (2.1 in)
- Source of power: Per trough, 4 electric motors of 160 kW (210 hp) each, giving a total of 640 kW (860 hp)
- Time taken to lift or lower a trough: 3 minutes
- Time taken to pass through the lift: 15–20 minutes
- Visitors per year: approx. 500,000

== See also ==
- Schiffshebewerk Scharnebeck, article on the German-language WikiPedia from which this article had been translated
- List of boat lifts
- Strépy-Thieu boat lift, Le Rœulx, Belgium
- Peterborough lift lock, Ontario, Canada
- Falkirk Wheel, Scotland, United Kingdom
- Anderton boat lift, Anderton, United Kingdom
