= Australoechemus celer =

Scientific classification
- Domain: Eukaryota
- Kingdom: Animalia
- Phylum: Arthropoda
- Subphylum: Chelicerata
- Class: Arachnida
- Order: Araneae
- Infraorder: Araneomorphae
- Family: Gnaphosidae
- Genus: Australoechemus
- Species: A. celer

Binomial name
- Australoechemus celer Schmidt & Piepho, 1994

Species of spider

Australoechemus celer is a species of ground spider of the family Gnaphosidae that is endemic in Cape Verde. The species was first described by Günter E. W. Schmidt and Friedhelm Piepho in 1994. It occurs on the islands of Sal and Santiago.

== Description ==
The male holotype measures about 5 mm.
