= Eucratoscelus pachypus =

Scientific classification
- Kingdom: Animalia
- Phylum: Arthropoda
- Subphylum: Chelicerata
- Class: Arachnida
- Order: Araneae
- Infraorder: Mygalomorphae
- Family: Theraphosidae
- Genus: Eucratoscelus
- Species: E. pachypus

Binomial name
- Eucratoscelus pachypus Schmidt & von Wirth, 1990

Synonyms
- Harpactira constricta; Eucratoscelus longiceps; Eucratoscelus constrictus; Eucratoscelus tenuitibialis

Species of tarantula

Eucratoscelus pachypus also known as the Tanzania stout leg baboon tarantula or the stout leg tarantula, was first described by Gunter Schmidt and Volker von Wirth in 1990. It is found in Tanzania, hailing from arid parts, and is an obligate burrower.

== Description ==
=== Females ===
The carapace of females is a dark brown color, the opisthosoma being black, with brownish reddish hairs covering it. Their first two legs are a light brown or grey color, sometimes looking a shade of golden. The third set of legs are black with golden lines in their segmentation. The legs closest to the opisthosoma are black, large and fluffy compared to the others, with golden lines in their segmentation.

=== Males ===
Males lack the stout legs found in females. The carapace of males are a golden brown color, the opisthosoma is golden brown in color with a zig zag line moving vertically in the center. The legs are a lighter golden brown that the rest of the tarantula, reaching all the way to the trochanter, where its the same golden brown color as the carapace. The legs being covered in grayish hairs.

== Habitat ==
They inhabit open savannah, grassland and scrubland areas in Tanzania. As such Mkomazi National Park will be the reference for this section. With average temperatures of 24°C and average yearly rain of 718mm with animals such as Zebras, Lions and Black Rhinos. And plants such as African myrrh, Arabic Gum tree and Glossy-Leaved corkwood.

== Behavior ==
This species is an obligate burrower, and make deep vertical tunnel, with a burrow at the bottom. They own a calmer behavior than other in the Harpactirinae subfamily, they most often run into their hide before getting aggressive. They own an incredible speed with a painful bite.

== Breeding ==
This tarantula is notoriously hard to breed, as most of the specimens for sale are wild caught females. Males are few and far between to come by, as they are usually not believe to be of the same species, as they lack those study legs. Add this to the fact they have a distinct courtship, thankfully this species have been consistently breed in multiple areas.
