= Minicia =

Scientific classification
- Kingdom: Animalia
- Phylum: Arthropoda
- Subphylum: Chelicerata
- Class: Arachnida
- Order: Araneae
- Infraorder: Araneomorphae
- Family: Linyphiidae
- Subfamily: Erigoninae
- Genus: Minicia; Thorell, 1875

Type species
- M. marginella (Wider, 1834)

Species
- 12, see text

Synonyms
- Flagellicymbium Schmidt, 1975

Genus of spiders

Minicia is a genus of dwarf spiders that was first described by Tamerlan Thorell in 1875.

== Species ==
As of May 2019 it contains twelve species and one subspecies:

- Minicia alticola Tanasevitch, 1990 – Georgia
- Minicia candida Denis, 1946 – Europe
  - Minicia c. obscurior Denis, 1964 – France
- Minicia caspiana Tanasevitch, 1990 – Azerbaijan
- Minicia elegans Simon, 1894 – Portugal, Algeria
- Minicia floresensis Wunderlich, 1992 – Azores
- Minicia gomerae (Schmidt, 1975) – Canary Is.
- Minicia grancanariensis Wunderlich, 1987 – Canary Is.
- Minicia kirghizica Tanasevitch, 1985 – Central Asia
- Minicia marginella (Wider, 1834) (type) – Europe, Caucasus
- Minicia pallida Eskov, 1995 – Russia, Kazakhstan
- Minicia teneriffensis Wunderlich, 1980 – Canary Is.
- Minicia vittata Caporiacco, 1935 – Kashmir
