= Carcinarachne =

Scientific classification
- Kingdom: Animalia
- Phylum: Arthropoda
- Subphylum: Chelicerata
- Class: Arachnida
- Order: Araneae
- Infraorder: Araneomorphae
- Family: Thomisidae
- Genus: Carcinarachne; Schmidt, 1956
- Species: C. brocki

Binomial name
- Carcinarachne brocki Schmidt, 1956

Monotypic genus of spiders

Carcinarachne is a monotypic genus of South American crab spiders containing the single species, Carcinarachne brocki. It was first described by Günter E. W. Schmidt in 1956, and has only been found in Ecuador.

== See also ==
- List of Thomisidae species
