= Eucratoscelus =

Scientific classification
- Kingdom: Animalia
- Phylum: Arthropoda
- Subphylum: Chelicerata
- Class: Arachnida
- Order: Araneae
- Infraorder: Mygalomorphae
- Family: Theraphosidae
- Genus: Eucratoscelus; Pocock, 1898

Type species
- E. constrictus (Gerstäcker, 1873)

Species
- E. constrictus (Gerstäcker, 1873) – Kenya, Tanzania; E. pachypus Schmidt & von Wirth, 1990 – Tanzania

Genus of spiders

Eucratoscelus is a genus of East African tarantulas that was first described by Reginald Innes Pocock in 1898. As of March 2020 it contains two species, found in Tanzania and Kenya: E. constrictus and E. pachypus.
