= Heiligenthal (Südergellersen) =

- Ortsteil of Südergellersen
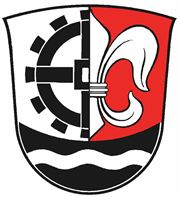
- Coat of arms
- Interactive map of Heiligenthal
- Location within Germany Location within Lower Saxony
- Coordinates: 53°22′15″N 10°33′46″E
- Country: Germany
- State: Lower Saxony
- District: Lüneburg
- Municipality: Südergellersen
- Elevation: 44 m (144 ft)

Population
  - Total: 381
- Time zone: UTC+01:00 (CET)
  - Summer (DST): UTC+02:00 (CEST)
- Postal codes: 21394
- Dialling codes: 04135
- Vehicle registration: LG

Heiligenthal is a village in the municipality of Südergellersen in the district of Lüneburg, Lower Saxony, Germany. It is located in the south-west of Lüneburg, the closest larger city which offers important infrastructure such as a railway station, highway access and a sport airfield. Single-family homes define the scape of the village in modern times. Until today several farmsteads are located in the south of the village and a chapel reminds of the former monastery Sancta Vallis, on which ground it was built. An important landmark, located opposite the chapel, is a war memorial reminding of soldiers who fought in World War I.

== Etymology ==
A list of goods by the Bishop of Verden dating back to 1252 uses the name Sybergeborstelde (later: Sibelincheborstolde or Sibelingheborstolde) for the village of Heiligenthal. In general, settlement names in the region consist out of a first part, here "Syberge," that records the peculiarity of the settlement area in question, thereby distinguishing it from all others and thus serving as an identifier. It possibly refers to the founder of the settlement, or peasant stable, that often formed a colony of another village. The second part, "borstelde," expresses that a home was built at this point. In particular, "Borstel" (also Burstalle or Bauerstall) referred to a peasant stable in the region of the Lüneburg Heath. Traditionally, distant villages build stables in heid grazing districts to house grazing sheep there. As a whole, the name can be translated as "The Residence of Sigibert." Later documents record the village under the name of Hilgendale, Hilligendahle or Alt-Heiligenthal (Antiqua Hilgendal), following the relocation of the Premonstratensian monastery Sancta Vallis (Holy Valley) from Kirchgellersen to Heiligenthal in the early 14th century. After the monks decided in 1383 to move the monastery into the secure walling of the large city of Lüneburg as a result of the War of the Lüneburg Succession, the village kept its name until today.

== History ==
Several tumulus are still visible today within the woods around the village. Studies show that the oldest date back to the Stone Age and archaeological excavations, that started in the 1990s, revealed tumulus from the Bronze Age that include several funerary gifts.

On 1 March 1974, Heiligenthal was integrated into the municipality of Südergellersen.

=== Population development ===
Year	1925	1933	1939
Population	133	160	146

== Religion ==
The village was part of the parish of Kirchgellersen in 1848. Until today it has its own chapel that is used for festive ceremonies and special occasions like weddings or funeral service. The brick chapel was first built in 1568 as shown by inscription panels that are embedded in the walls in memory of the founder, Anna von Möller, wife of the first laird of Heiligenthal. Renovation were carried out in 1837, 1922 and 1975. The baptismal was created in 1665 by an unknown artist.

== Transportation ==
Heiligenthal is connected to all surrounding villages by a network of city-level asphalt roads. Only minor settlements, like Böhmsholz, are connected to Heiligenthal by sand roads.

=== Individual transport ===
Private transport is essential in Heiligenthal with most citizen owning a private car. With three exceptions, all roads within the village are connected by the main road, the Hauptstraße which forms a central axis. In the North-East it connects Heiligenthal to Rettmer and Lüneburg while it continuous in the West towards Kirchgellersen. South of the main road lies the Südergellerser Weg, running towards Südergellersen as well as In de Tüünen and Am Sportplatz, both connecting the Südergellerser Weg with the Hauptstraße. North of it lies the Voigtskamp, the Schnellenberger Weg, the Gutshof as well as the Böhmsholzer Weg. Only the latter continuous as an asphalt road towards Kirchgellersen and serves the Lerchenweg, Heideweg and Waldweg.

Besides, all main roads connecting Heiligenthal to surrounding villages are equipped with bike lanes next to the street allowing for an environmentally friendly commute.

=== Public transport ===
Despite Heiligenthals heavy reliance on private modes of transport, it is served by the local transportation network of the KVG and HVV, with infrequent bus connections to Lüneburg and surrounding villages. Those are mostly used by schoolchildren, commuters and elderly and are in part operated at an on demand basis. The buses of the on-demand pilot project are running, like the regular service, along a fixed route and at a fixed timetable. However, only if requested by passengers in advance. The project aims to organically improve the affordable public transport and to uphold a flexibility that guarantees adjustments to customers needs. For the customer, the usual HVV tariff applies. As of 2021, the on-demand line 5251 serves the villages of Kirchgellersen, Oedeme, Südergellersen, Reppenstedt, Dachtmissen, Vögelsen and Bardowick.
