= Michael Krüger =

Michael Krüger may refer to:

- Michael Krüger (footballer) (born 1954), German football manager and former player
- Michael Krüger (writer) (born 1943), German writer, publisher, and translator
