= Ilmenau (disambiguation) =

Ilmenau can refer to:

- Ilmenau, a town in the Ilm-Kreis, Thuringia, Germany
- Ilmenau (river), a tributary of the Elbe in Lower Saxony, Germany.
- Ilmenau, Lower Saxony, a municipality in the district of Lüneburg, Lower Saxony, Germany.
- German name of Jordanów
- German name of Limanowa
