= Heiligenthal =

Heiligenthal may refer to:

- Heiligenthal, Saxony-Anhalt, a village in Saxony-Anhalt
- Heiligenthal (Südergellersen), a village in Lower Saxony
- Heiligenthal Abbey
