= Australoechemus =

Scientific classification
- Kingdom: Animalia
- Phylum: Arthropoda
- Subphylum: Chelicerata
- Class: Arachnida
- Order: Araneae
- Infraorder: Araneomorphae
- Family: Gnaphosidae
- Genus: Australoechemus; Schmidt & Piepho, 1994

Type species
- A. oecobiophilus Schmidt & Piepho, 1994

Species
- A. celer Schmidt & Piepho, 1994 – Cape Verde Is.; A. oecobiophilus Schmidt & Piepho, 1994 – Cape Verde Is.

Genus of spiders

Australoechemus is a genus of West African ground spiders that was first described by Günter Schmidt (arachnologist), M. Geisthardt & F. Piepho in 1994. As of May 2019 it contains only two species, both found on the Cape Verde islands: A. celer and A. oecobiophilus.
