= Bruchwetter =

River in Germany

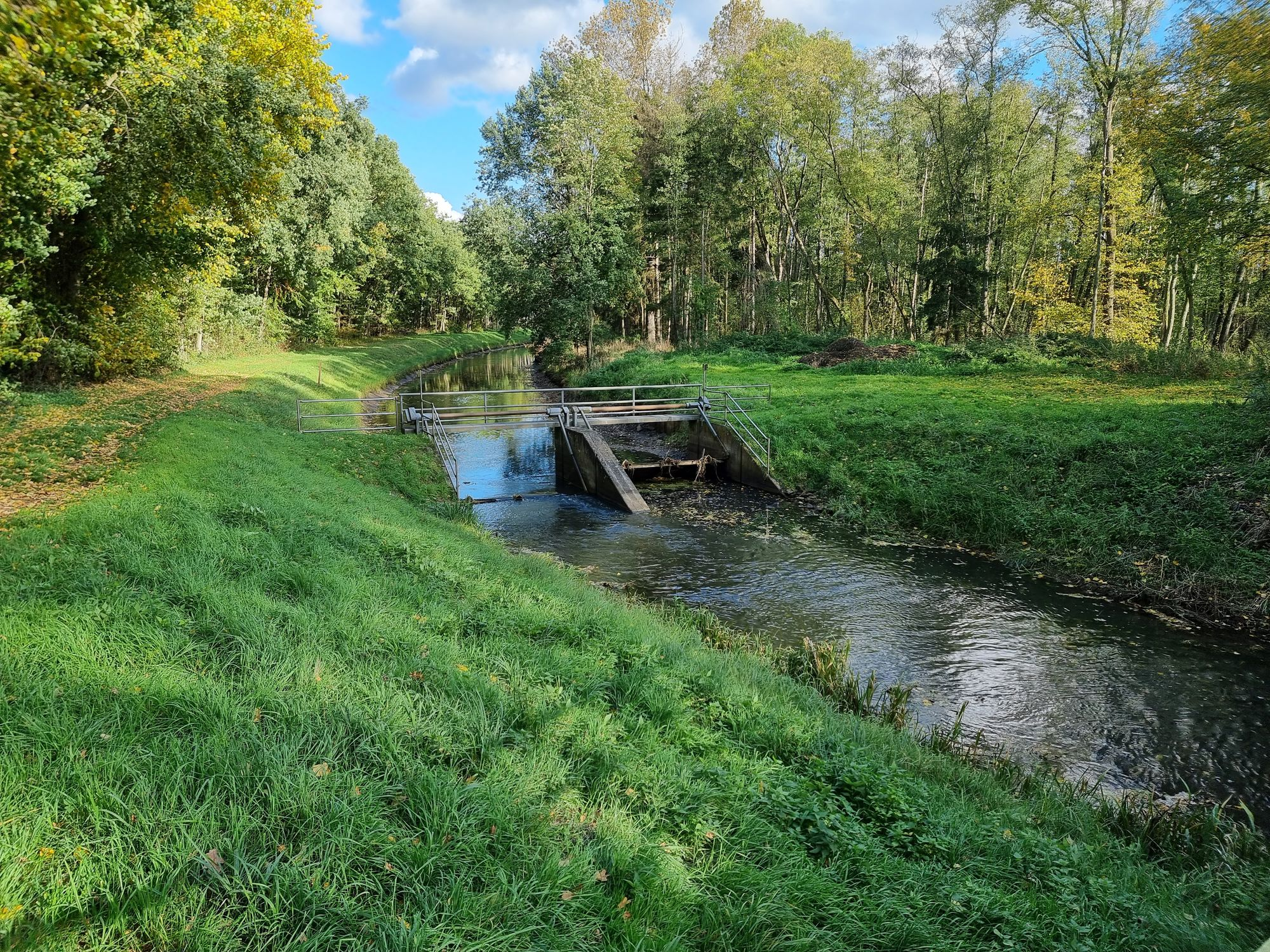

Location
- Country: Germany
- State: Lower Saxony

Physical characteristics
- Mouth
  - location: Neetze
  - coordinates: 53.3285°N 10.5317°E
- Length: 17.9 km (11.1 mi)

Basin features
- Progression: Neetze→ Ilmenau→ Elbe→ North Sea

Bruchwetter is a river of Lower Saxony, Germany. It flows into the Neetze near Echem.

== See also ==
- List of rivers of Lower Saxony
