= Agnes Karll =

German nurse and nursing reformer

- Born: 25 March 1868; Embsen, Germany
- Died: 12 February 1927 (aged 58); Berlin, Germany
- Burial place: Gadebusch, Germany
- Other name: Agnes Karl
- Occupations: Nurse, nursing reformer
- Known for: Nursing activism

Agnes Caroline Pauline Karll (25 March 1868 – 12 February 1927) (also spelled as Agnes Karl) was a German nurse and a nursing reformer. She served as the third president of the International Council of Nurses from 1909 to 1912, and was an honorary member of the Association of Head Nurses in Great Britain and Ireland.

== Life and work ==
Agnes Karll was born 25 March 1868 at Embsen, Germany, the daughter of Theodor Karll and his wife Ida. Her parents separated in 1881.

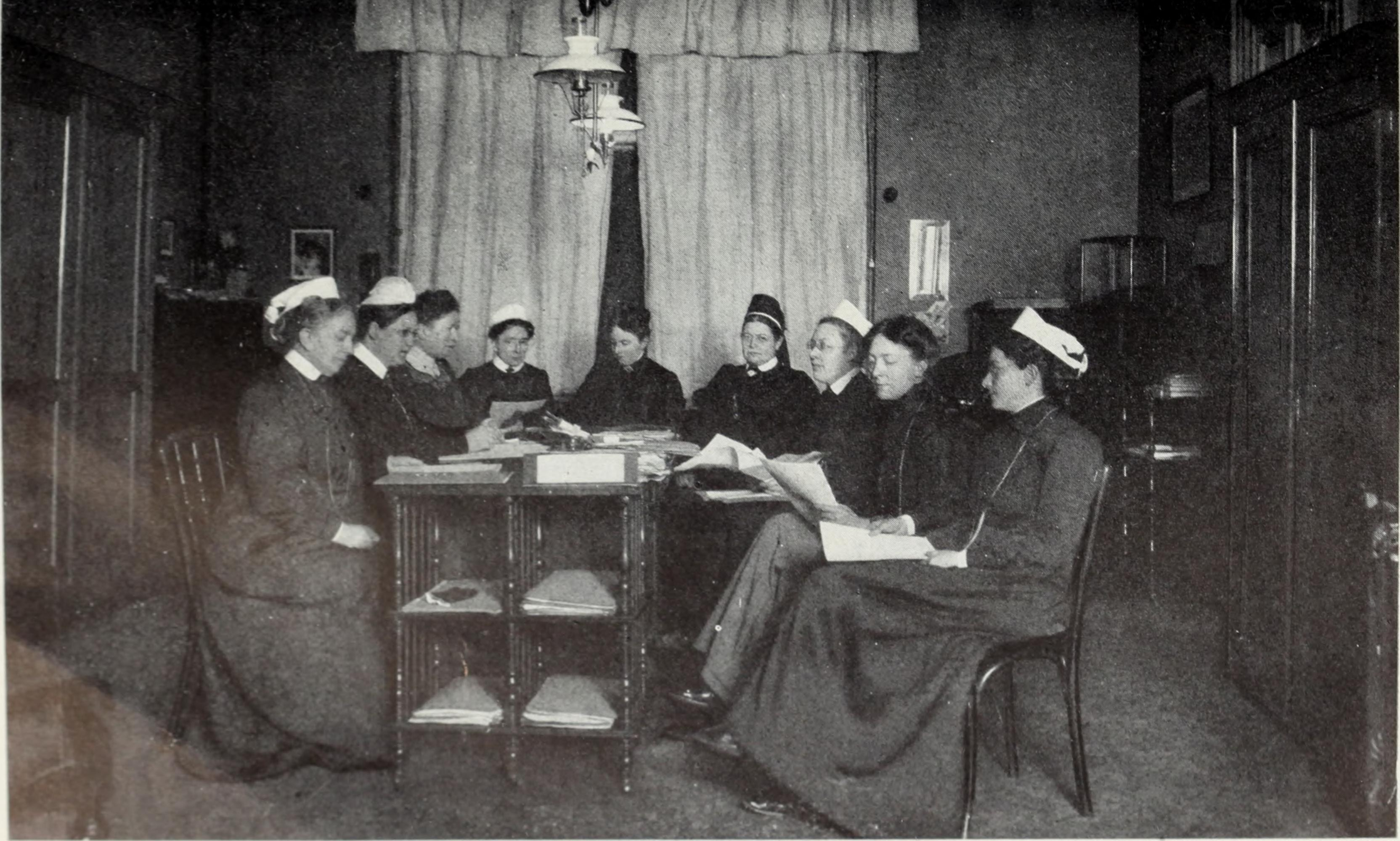
A business meeting of the officers of the German Nurses' Association, with Agnes Karll on the far right.

Karll's first ambition was to become a teacher and attended Johanna Willborn's advanced training school in Schwerin, which put her in touch with the women's movement at the time and allowed her to meet German feminist Helene Lange. However, when she graduated, she was not eligible to take the teacher's examination because she was too young. She began working as an educator and private teacher in 1886 in Retgendorf (now Dobin am See) and Alt Gaarz. By the age of 19, Karll realized that teaching was not the profession she wanted to pursue.

=== Nursing ===
On 26 August 1887, Karll began training as a nurse at the Clementine House in Hanover, which was a mother house of the Red Cross. She then worked as a nurse at the clinics of the University of Göttingen.

From 1891 on, she worked for ten years in private clinics, especially around Berlin. It was also during this period that she had the opportunity to spend a few months in the United States and to make herself known there as a nurse (1894). Afterwards, she continued to forge professional links with nurses in other countries, especially in England, Finland and Austria.

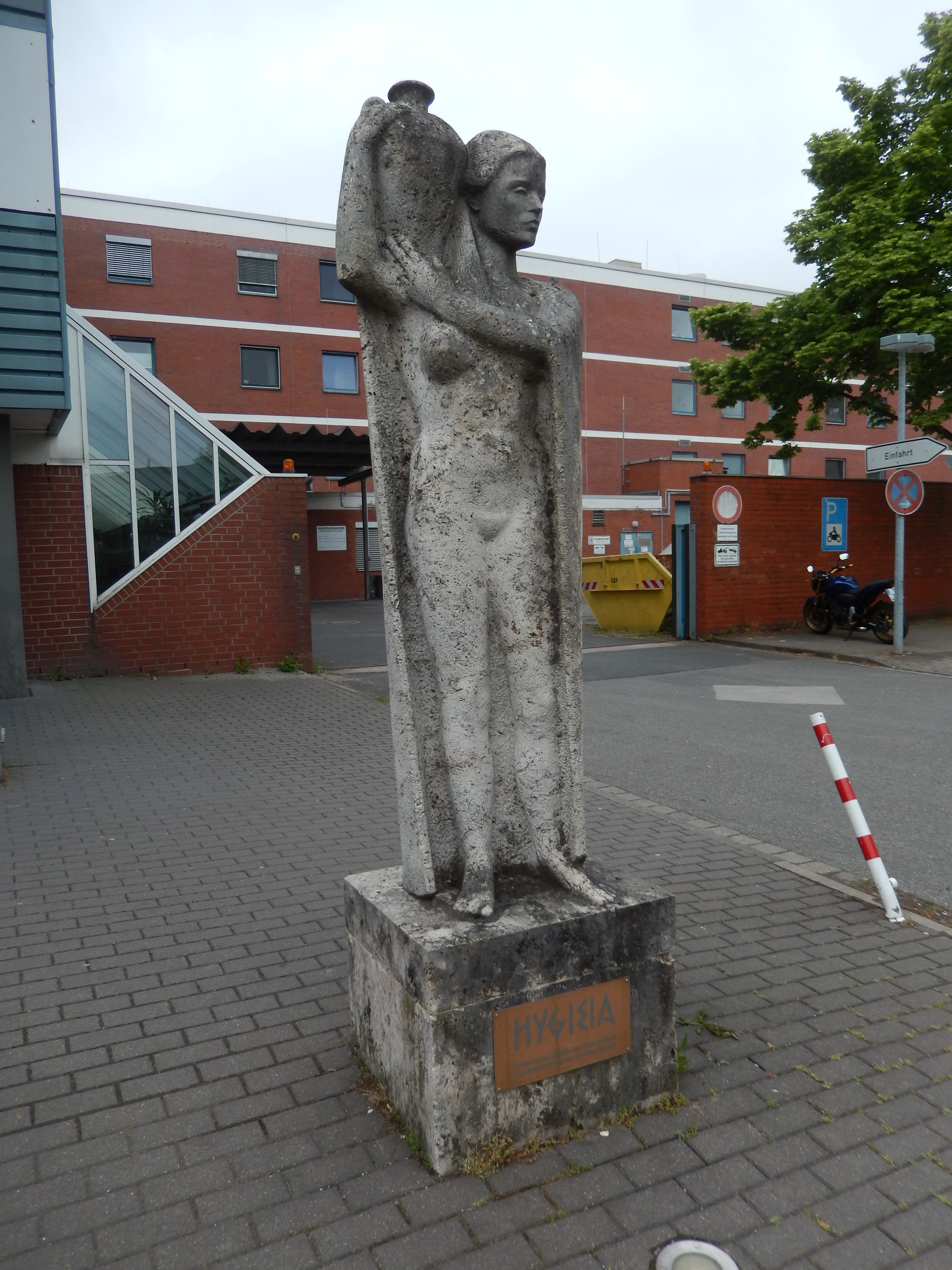
Clinic Agnes Karll in Laatzen, Germany

Karll worked tirelessly toward the independence of nurses and widespread recognition of the new nursing profession. She coined the term “nurse.” In 1907, she established a systematic and well-founded three-year nurses training program, including a final examination and state recognition. Because of her efforts, further improvements were introduced regularly for everyday nursing work, including a wage sufficient to cover the cost of living.

As part of the German Association of Female Citizens (Allgemeinen Deutschen Frauenvereins), in 1903 she founded an organization of women dedicated to care, German Nurses Association of which she was the first president. The association helped its members find work and provided them with insurance and legal advice. Later, it was renamed Agnes-Karll-Verband, and then Deutschen Berufsverband für Krankenpflege eV (DBfK) in 1973. Today it is named Deutscher Berufsverband für Pflegeberufe (DBfK) and is the largest free professional nurses` association in Germany.

Agnes Karll committed herself to building respectability for the nursing profession and establishing a three-year training course. It was also her idea to establish a new profession of nursing assistant.

In 1909 in London, she became the third president of the International Council of Nurses, and was an honorary member of the Association of Head Nurses in Great Britain and Ireland (Matrons' Council for Great Britain and Ireland). From 1913, she was one of the first women to work as a lecturer at the Leipzig Women's University. In 1926 she led a national congress of nurses in Düsseldorf, Germany.

=== Later years ===
In the last years of her life, Agnes Karll was accompanied by a Swiss woman, Emmy Oser. It was through her that Karll came into contact with the Reformed theologian Leonhard Ragaz in Zürich, who was very attentive to the needs of the nursing profession and would be one of Agnes Karll's inspirations.

Karll died in 1927 in Berlin, and is buried in the family vault on Jarmstorfer Strasse, in a secluded spot in the old Gadebuscher cemetery.

== Tributes ==
Among the tributes paid to the memory of Agnes Karll:

- Agnes Karll Institute for Nursing Research in Berlin (Agnes Karll Institut für Pflegeforschung, AKI)
- Clinics in Bad Schwartau and Laatzen
- Nursing schools in Frankfurt am Main and Tettnang
- Streets in Gadebusch, Mainz, Embsen and Elmshorn
