= Theridion luteitarse =

Scientific classification
- Kingdom: Animalia
- Phylum: Arthropoda
- Subphylum: Chelicerata
- Class: Arachnida
- Order: Araneae
- Infraorder: Araneomorphae
- Family: Theridiidae
- Genus: Theridion
- Species: T. luteitarse

Binomial name
- Theridion luteitarse Schmidt & Krause, 1995

Species of spider

Theridion luteitarse is a species of spiders of the family Theridiidae. It is endemic on the island of Santo Antão, Cape Verde. The species was named and described by Günter E. W. Schmidt and Rolf Harald Krause in 1995.
