= Mechtersen =

- Municipality
- Coat of arms

- Location of Mechtersen within Lüneburg district
- Interactive map of Mechtersen
- Location within Germany Location within Lower Saxony
- Coordinates: 53°17′N 10°19′E
- Country: Germany
- State: Lower Saxony
- District: Lüneburg
- Municipal assoc.: Bardowick

Government
  - Mayor: Rudolf Harms (CDU)

Area
  - Total: 14.42 km^{2} (5.57 sq mi)
- Elevation: 15 m (49 ft)

Population (2025-12-31)
  - Total: 664
  - Density: 46.0/km^{2} (119/sq mi)
- Time zone: UTC+01:00 (CET)
  - Summer (DST): UTC+02:00 (CEST)
- Postal codes: 21358
- Dialling codes: 04178
- Vehicle registration: LG

Mechtersen is a municipality in the district of Lüneburg, in Lower Saxony, Germany. It is part of the Samtgemeinde Bardowick ("collective municipality Bardowick").
