= Rullstorf =

- Municipality
- Coat of arms

- Location of Rullstorf within Lüneburg district
- Interactive map of Rullstorf
- Location within Germany Location within Lower Saxony
- Coordinates: 53°17′N 10°32′E
- Country: Germany
- State: Lower Saxony
- District: Lüneburg
- Municipal assoc.: Scharnebeck
- Subdivisions: 2

Government
  - Mayor: Franz-Heinrich Darger (CDU)

Area
  - Total: 22.82 km^{2} (8.81 sq mi)
- Elevation: 33 m (108 ft)

Population (2025-12-31)
  - Total: 1,927
  - Density: 84.44/km^{2} (218.7/sq mi)
- Time zone: UTC+01:00 (CET)
  - Summer (DST): UTC+02:00 (CEST)
- Postal codes: 21379
- Dialling codes: 04136
- Vehicle registration: LG

Rullstorf is a municipality in the district of Lüneburg, in Lower Saxony, Germany.
