= Lüdersburg =

- Municipality
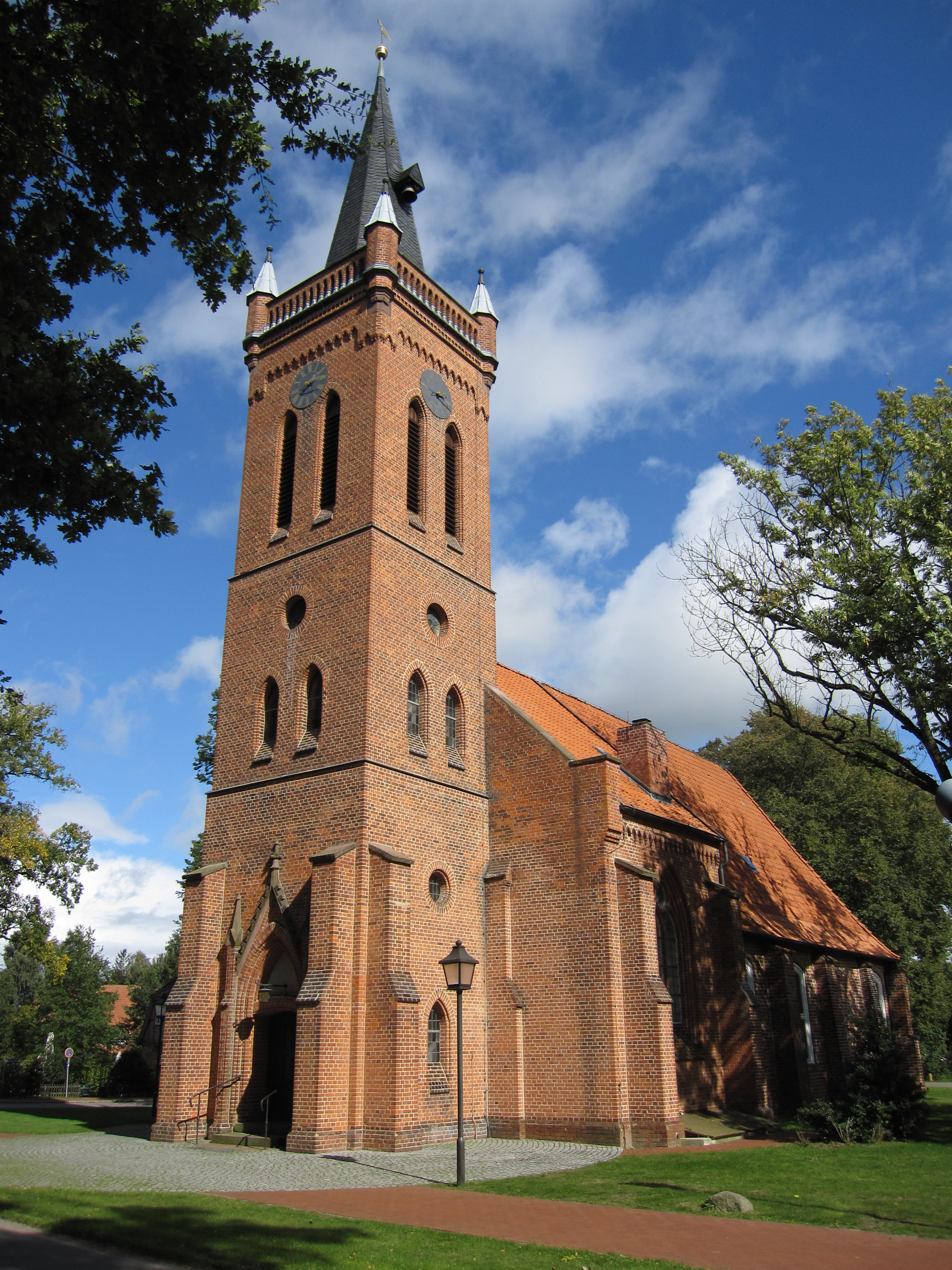
- Church of Saints Peter and Paul

- Coat of arms

- Location of Lüdersburg within Lüneburg district
- Interactive map of Lüdersburg
- Location within Germany Location within Lower Saxony
- Coordinates: 53°19′N 10°34′E
- Country: Germany
- State: Lower Saxony
- District: Lüneburg
- Municipal assoc.: Scharnebeck
- Subdivisions: 5

Government
  - Mayor: Klaus Bockelmann

Area
  - Total: 18.87 km^{2} (7.29 sq mi)
- Elevation: 6 m (20 ft)

Population (2025-12-31)
  - Total: 684
  - Density: 36.2/km^{2} (93.9/sq mi)
- Time zone: UTC+01:00 (CET)
  - Summer (DST): UTC+02:00 (CEST)
- Postal codes: 21379
- Dialling codes: 04139, 05850, 04136
- Vehicle registration: LG
- Website: https://www.gemeinde-luedersburg.de/

Lüdersburg is a municipality in the district of Lüneburg, in Lower Saxony, Germany.
