= Barum, Lüneburg =

Barum
- Municipality
- Coat of arms

- Location of Barum within Lüneburg district
- Interactive map of Barum
- Location within Germany Location within Lower Saxony
- Coordinates: 53°21′7″N 10°24′22″E
- Country: Germany
- State: Lower Saxony
- District: Lüneburg
- Municipal assoc.: Bardowick
- Subdivisions: 3

Government
  - Mayor: Werner Meyn (CDU)

Area
  - Total: 9.83 km^{2} (3.80 sq mi)
- Elevation: 4 m (13 ft)

Population (2025-12-31)
  - Total: 2,009
  - Density: 204/km^{2} (529/sq mi)
- Time zone: UTC+01:00 (CET)
  - Summer (DST): UTC+02:00 (CEST)
- Postal codes: 21357
- Dialling codes: 04133
- Vehicle registration: LG
- Website: Homepage der Samtgemeinde

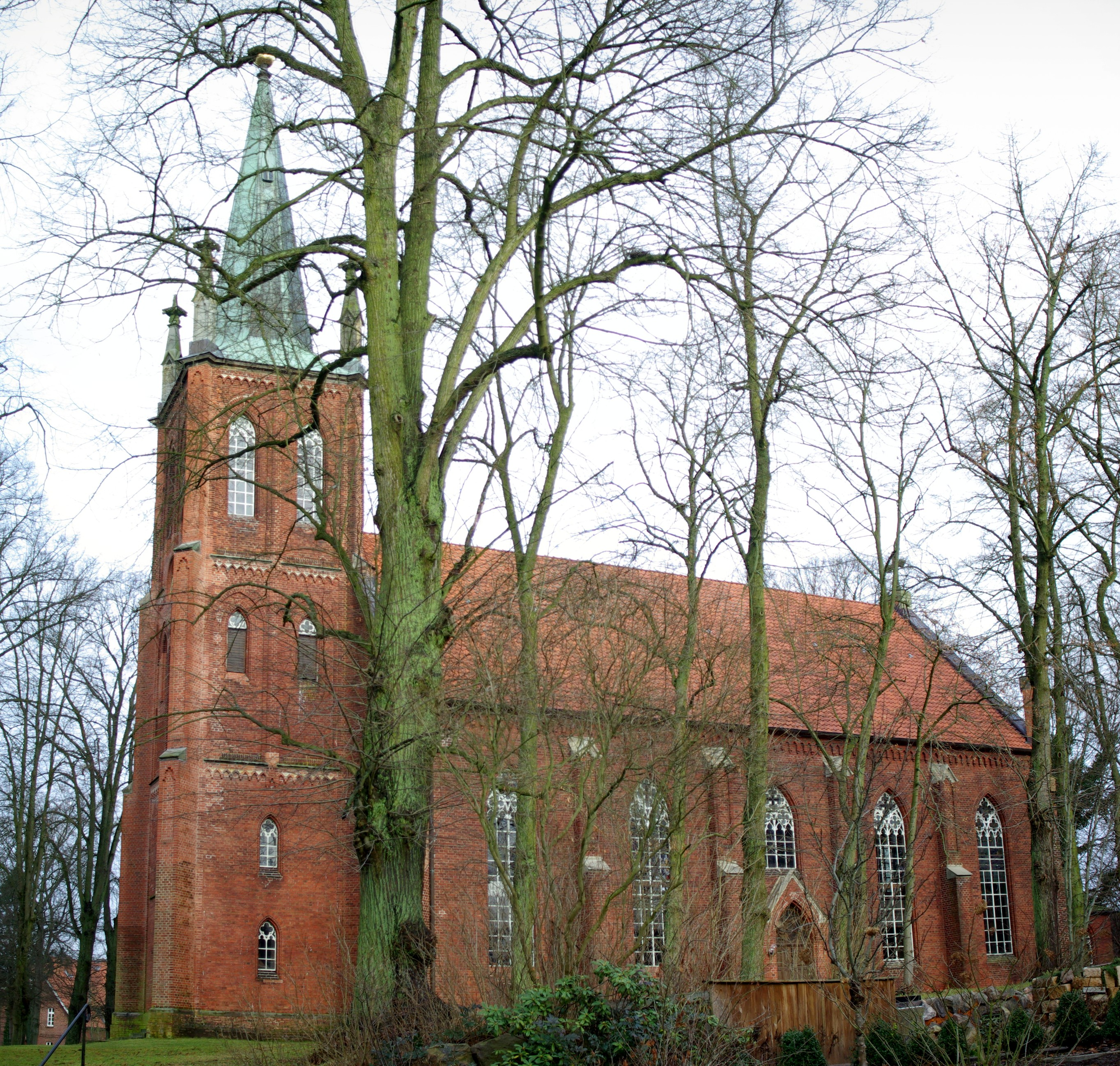
St. Dionysius-Church in St. Dionys

Barum (German pronunciation: [ˈbaːʁʊm]) is a municipality in the district of Lüneburg, in Lower Saxony, Germany. Barum has an area of 9.8 km² and a population of 1,844 (as of December 31, 2007). Barum is subdivided into the parts Barum, Horburg and St. Dionys. Barum is crossed by the river Neetze.
