= German Nurses Association =

The German Nurses Association was founded in 1903 by Agnes Karll, who was later elected president. It has changed its name several times and is now called “Deutscher Berufsverband für Pflegeberufe” (German Organisation of Nursing Professionals). It has a central office in Berlin and four regional offices. It was a founding member of the International Council of Nurses of which in 1909, Agnes Karll was elected president.

It complains that commercial health providers do not keep to employer-union agreed pay rates.
