= Bienenbüttel =

- Municipality
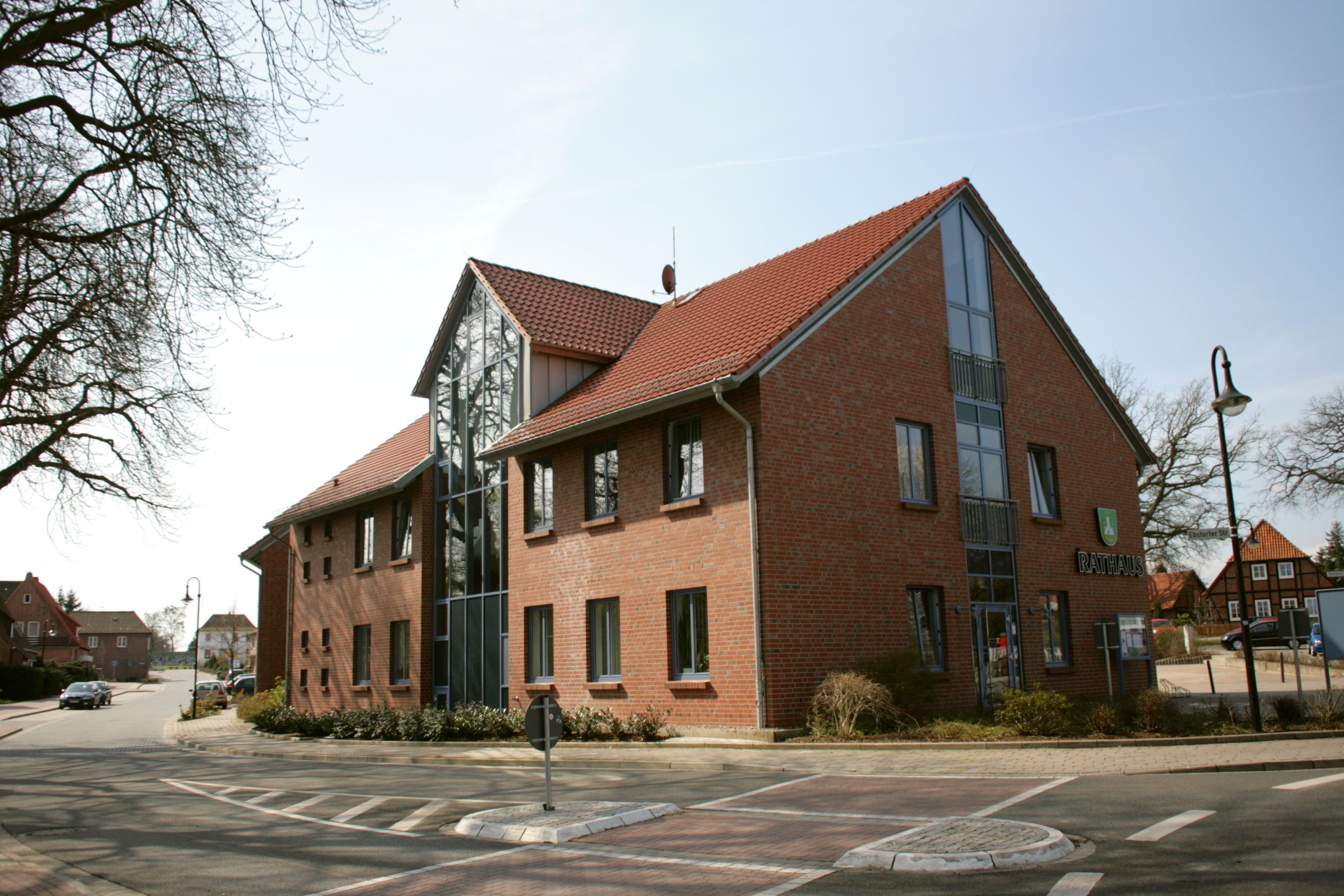
- Town hall

- Coat of arms

- Location of Bienenbüttel within Uelzen district
- Interactive map of Bienenbüttel
- Location within Germany Location within Lower Saxony
- Coordinates: 53°8′36″N 10°29′25″E
- Country: Germany
- State: Lower Saxony
- District: Uelzen
- Subdivisions: 14 districts

Government
  - Mayor (2021–26): Merlin Franke (CDU)

Area
  - Total: 99 km^{2} (38 sq mi)
- Elevation: 30 m (98 ft)

Population (2025-12-31)
  - Total: 6,583
  - Density: 66/km^{2} (170/sq mi)
- Time zone: UTC+01:00 (CET)
  - Summer (DST): UTC+02:00 (CEST)
- Postal codes: 29553
- Dialling codes: 05823
- Vehicle registration: UE
- Website: www.bienenbuettel.de

Bienenbüttel is a free municipality in the district of Uelzen, in Lower Saxony, Germany. It is situated on the river Ilmenau, approximately 20 kilometres (12 mi) north of Uelzen, and 13 kilometres (8 mi) southeast of Lüneburg. Bienenbüttel is a part of the Hamburg Metropolitan Region and of the Lüneburg Heath (German: Lüneburger Heide).

Bienenbüttel is the seat of the Einheitsgemeinde ("free municipality") Bienenbüttel. Incorporated into the municipality are the villages of Bargdorf, Beverbeck with Grünewald, Bornsen, Edendorf, Eitzen I with Bardenhagen, Grünhagen, Hohenbostel, Hohnstorf, Niendorf, Rieste with Neu-Rieste, Steddorf with Neu-Steddorf, Varendorf, Wichmannsburg and Wulfstorf.

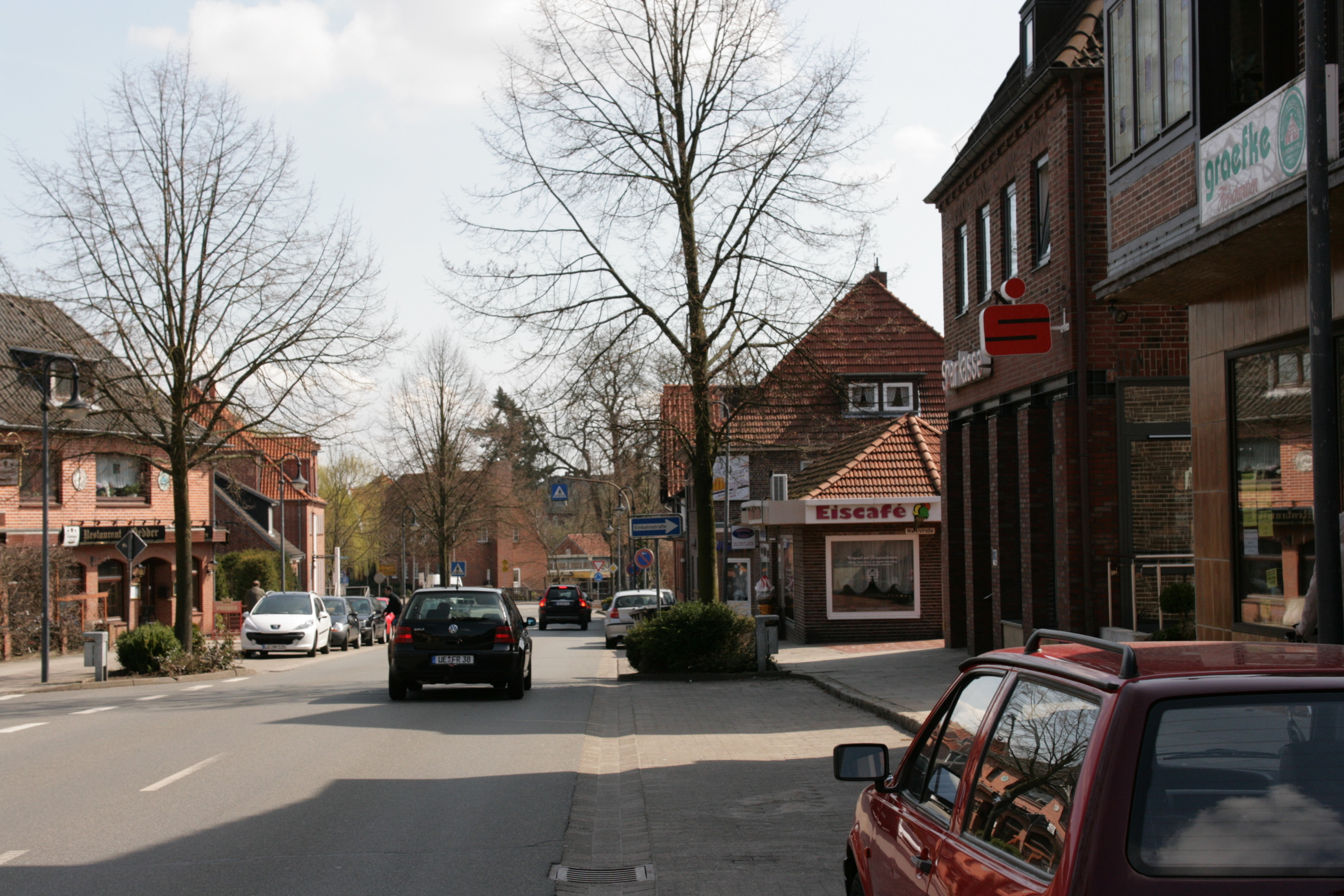
Bahnhofstraße in Bienenbüttel

Bienenbüttel is located on the Elbe Lateral Canal, a 115-kilometre (71 mi) long waterway, and has a station on the highspeed Hanover–Hamburg railway (Hamburg-Uelzen-Hannover).
