= Bardowick =

- Municipality
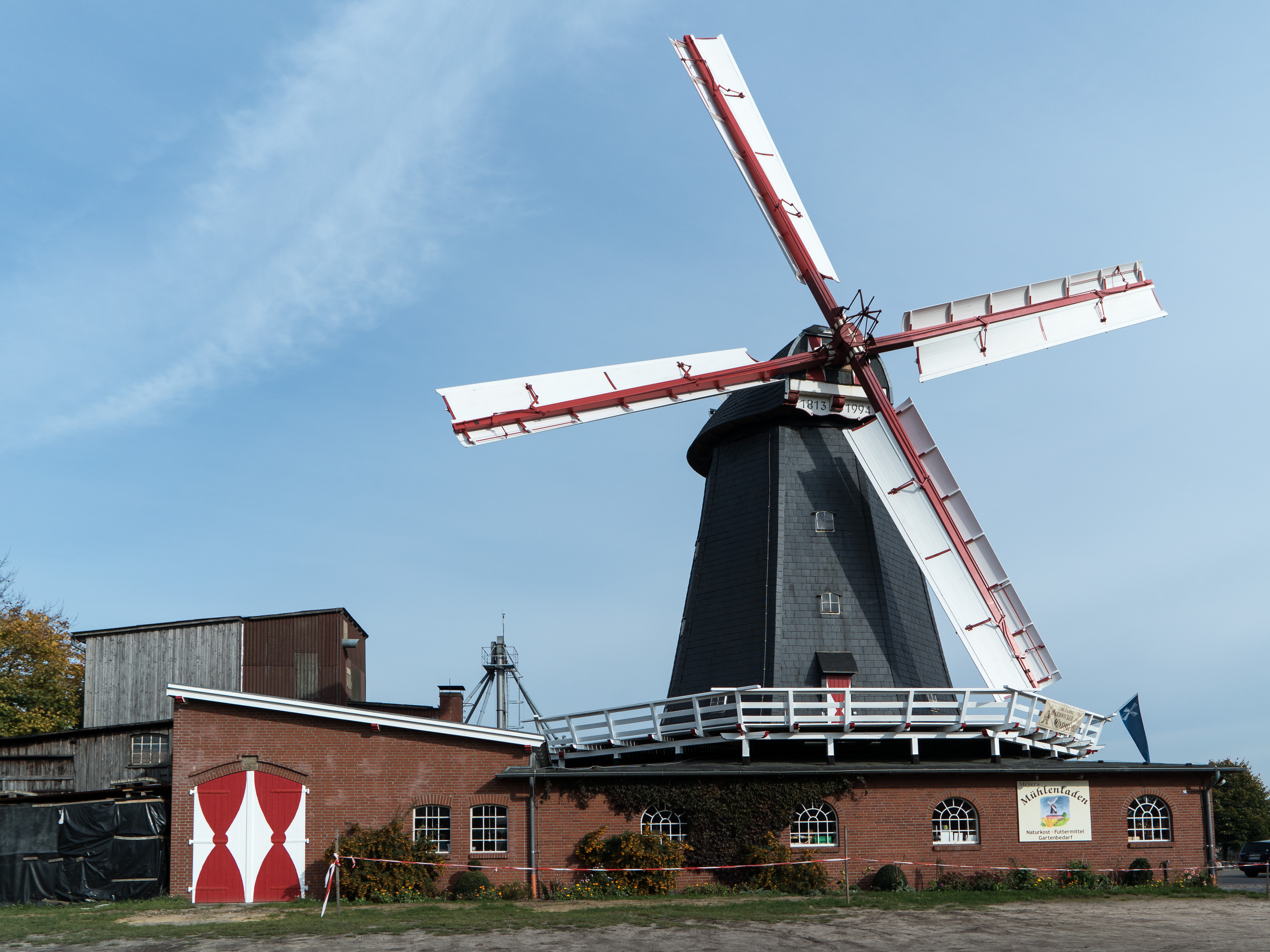
- Bardowick Windmill

- Coat of arms

- Location of Bardowick within Lüneburg district
- Interactive map of Bardowick
- Location within Germany Location within Lower Saxony
- Coordinates: 53°17′57″N 10°23′42″E
- Country: Germany
- State: Lower Saxony
- District: Lüneburg
- Municipal assoc.: Bardowick

Area
  - Total: 23.25 km^{2} (8.98 sq mi)
- Elevation: 8 m (26 ft)

Population (2025-12-31)
  - Total: 6,531
  - Density: 280.9/km^{2} (727.5/sq mi)
- Time zone: UTC+01:00 (CET)
  - Summer (DST): UTC+02:00 (CEST)
- Postal codes: 21357
- Dialling codes: 04131
- Vehicle registration: LG
- Website: www.bardowick.de

Bardowick is a municipality in the district of Lüneburg in Lower Saxony, Germany. It is three miles north of Lüneburg on the navigable river Ilmenau. Bardowick is also the seat of the Samtgemeinde ("collective municipality") Bardowick.

== Name ==
This municipality also has the following names in the following languages:

- Bewick, in Low Saxon

== History ==
Bardowiek was founded in the 8th century by Charlemagne, who established a bishopric in it, and until its destruction by Henry the Lion in 1189, it was the most prosperous commercial city of north Germany. Its name is derived from the Lombards (Longobardi), the tribe for whom it was the home and centre, and from it the colonization of Lombardy started.

The town was first mentioned in 795 AD and was raised to city status in 972 by Otto I.

In 1146 the collegiate church of Saints Peter and Paul is recorded first. In 1186 the then competent Prince-Bishop of Verden, Tammo (d. 1188), further privileged the collegiate church.

The city was razed to the ground, with the exception of the churches, in 1189 by Henry the Lion. Until that time, it was the most prosperous commercial city in northern Germany.

Today's building of the former collegiate, meanwhile Lutheran church (German: Bardowicker Dom, with Dom being used in German language - pars pro toto - as a synecdoche for collegiate churches and cathedrals alike) was erected between 1389 and 1485.
