= Tosterglope =

- Municipality
- Location of Tosterglope within Lüneburg district
- Interactive map of Tosterglope
- Location within Germany Location within Lower Saxony
- Coordinates: 53°13′N 10°49′E
- Country: Germany
- State: Lower Saxony
- District: Lüneburg
- Municipal assoc.: Dahlenburg
- Subdivisions: 4 Ortsteile

Government
  - Mayor: Stefan Betzenberger

Area
  - Total: 19.53 km^{2} (7.54 sq mi)
- Elevation: 80 m (260 ft)

Population (2025-12-31)
  - Total: 607
  - Density: 31.1/km^{2} (80.5/sq mi)
- Time zone: UTC+01:00 (CET)
  - Summer (DST): UTC+02:00 (CEST)
- Postal codes: 21371
- Dialling codes: 05851, 05853
- Vehicle registration: LG
- Website: www.tosterglope.de

Tosterglope is a municipality in the district of Lüneburg, in Lower Saxony, Germany.
