= Barnstedt =

- Municipality
- Coat of arms

- Location of Barnstedt within Lüneburg district
- Interactive map of Barnstedt
- Location within Germany Location within Lower Saxony
- Coordinates: 53°08′15″N 10°22′24″E
- Country: Germany
- State: Lower Saxony
- District: Lüneburg
- Municipal assoc.: Ilmenau

Government
  - Mayor: Hans-Georg Brümmerhoff

Area
  - Total: 19.77 km^{2} (7.63 sq mi)
- Elevation: 49 m (161 ft)

Population (2025-12-31)
  - Total: 753
  - Density: 38.1/km^{2} (98.6/sq mi)
- Time zone: UTC+01:00 (CET)
  - Summer (DST): UTC+02:00 (CEST)
- Postal codes: 21406
- Dialling codes: 04134
- Vehicle registration: LG

Barnstedt (German pronunciation: [ˈbaʁnʃtɛt]) is a municipality in the district of Lüneburg, in Lower Saxony, Germany.
