= Vögelsen =

- Municipality
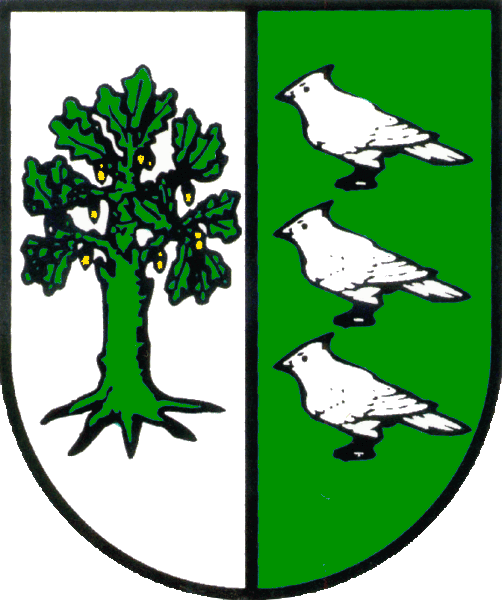
- Coat of arms

- Location of Vögelsen within Lüneburg district
- Interactive map of Vögelsen
- Location within Germany Location within Lower Saxony
- Coordinates: 53°16′5″N 10°21′3″E
- Country: Germany
- State: Lower Saxony
- District: Lüneburg
- Municipal assoc.: Bardowick

Government
  - Mayor: Silke Rogge (SPD)

Area
  - Total: 8.26 km^{2} (3.19 sq mi)
- Elevation: 23 m (75 ft)

Population (2025-12-31)
  - Total: 2,448
  - Density: 296/km^{2} (768/sq mi)
- Time zone: UTC+01:00 (CET)
  - Summer (DST): UTC+02:00 (CEST)
- Postal codes: 21360
- Dialling codes: 04131
- Vehicle registration: LG
- Website: Samtgemeinde Bardowick

Vögelsen is a municipality in the district of Lüneburg, in Lower Saxony, Germany.
