= Hittbergen =

- Municipality
- Coat of arms

- Location of Hittbergen within Lüneburg district
- Interactive map of Hittbergen
- Location within Germany Location within Lower Saxony
- Coordinates: 53°21′N 10°36′E
- Country: Germany
- State: Lower Saxony
- District: Lüneburg
- Municipal assoc.: Scharnebeck
- Subdivisions: 2

Government
  - Mayor: Petra Brosseit (CDU)

Area
  - Total: 14.64 km^{2} (5.65 sq mi)
- Elevation: 5 m (16 ft)

Population (2025-12-31)
  - Total: 952
  - Density: 65.0/km^{2} (168/sq mi)
- Time zone: UTC+01:00 (CET)
  - Summer (DST): UTC+02:00 (CEST)
- Postal codes: 21522
- Dialling codes: 04139
- Vehicle registration: LG

Hittbergen is a municipality in the district of Lüneburg, in Lower Saxony, Germany.
