= Reppenstedt =

- Municipality
- Coat of arms

- Location of Reppenstedt within Lüneburg district
- Interactive map of Reppenstedt
- Location within Germany Location within Lower Saxony
- Coordinates: 53°15′00″N 10°21′11″E
- Country: Germany
- State: Lower Saxony
- District: Lüneburg
- Municipal assoc.: Gellersen

Government
  - Mayor: Klaus Olshof (CDU)

Area
  - Total: 14.78 km^{2} (5.71 sq mi)
- Elevation: 36 m (118 ft)

Population (2025-12-31)
  - Total: 7,029
  - Density: 475.6/km^{2} (1,232/sq mi)
- Time zone: UTC+01:00 (CET)
  - Summer (DST): UTC+02:00 (CEST)
- Postal codes: 21391
- Dialling codes: 04131
- Vehicle registration: LG
- Website: www.reppenstedt.de

Reppenstedt is a municipality and the administrative centre of the Samtgemeinde Gellersen within the district of Lüneburg in Lower Saxony, Germany.
