= Brietlingen =

- Municipality
- Coat of arms

- Location of Brietlingen within Lüneburg district
- Interactive map of Brietlingen
- Location within Germany Location within Lower Saxony
- Coordinates: 53°20′N 10°27′E
- Country: Germany
- State: Lower Saxony
- District: Lüneburg
- Municipal assoc.: Scharnebeck
- Subdivisions: 3

Government
  - Mayor: Herbert Meyn (SPD)

Area
  - Total: 19.73 km^{2} (7.62 sq mi)
- Elevation: 4 m (13 ft)

Population (2025-12-31)
  - Total: 3,357
  - Density: 170.1/km^{2} (440.7/sq mi)
- Time zone: UTC+01:00 (CET)
  - Summer (DST): UTC+02:00 (CEST)
- Postal codes: 21382
- Dialling codes: 04133
- Vehicle registration: LG
- Website: Samtgemeinde Scharnebeck

Brietlingen is a municipality in the district of Lüneburg, in Lower Saxony, Germany.
