= Dahlem, Lower Saxony =

Dahlem
- Municipality
- Location of Dahlem within Lüneburg district
- Interactive map of Dahlem
- Location within Germany Location within Lower Saxony
- Coordinates: 53°12′N 10°45′E
- Country: Germany
- State: Lower Saxony
- District: Lüneburg
- Municipal assoc.: Dahlenburg

Government
  - Mayor: Ralf Böttcher

Area
  - Total: 16.99 km^{2} (6.56 sq mi)
- Elevation: 54 m (177 ft)

Population (2025-12-31)
  - Total: 501
  - Density: 29.5/km^{2} (76.4/sq mi)
- Time zone: UTC+01:00 (CET)
  - Summer (DST): UTC+02:00 (CEST)
- Postal codes: 21368
- Dialling codes: 05851, 05854
- Vehicle registration: LG

Dahlem (German pronunciation: [ˈdaːləm]) is a municipality in the district of Lüneburg, in Lower Saxony, Germany. Dahlem has an area of 16.99 km^{2} and a population of 527 (as of December 31, 2007).
