= Westergellersen =

- Municipality
- Coat of arms

- Location of Westergellersen within Lüneburg district
- Interactive map of Westergellersen
- Location within Germany Location within Lower Saxony
- Coordinates: 53°14′N 10°15′E
- Country: Germany
- State: Lower Saxony
- District: Lüneburg
- Municipal assoc.: Gellersen

Government
  - Mayor: Hans-Jürgen Nischk (CDU)

Area
  - Total: 20.38 km^{2} (7.87 sq mi)
- Elevation: 55 m (180 ft)

Population (2025-12-31)
  - Total: 1,983
  - Density: 97.30/km^{2} (252.0/sq mi)
- Time zone: UTC+01:00 (CET)
  - Summer (DST): UTC+02:00 (CEST)
- Postal codes: 21394
- Dialling codes: 04135
- Vehicle registration: LG
- Website: www.westergellersen.de

Westergellersen is a municipality in the district of Lüneburg, in Lower Saxony, Germany.

== Geographical Location ==
Westergellersen is a village approximately 10 km west of Lueneburg and together with Kirchgellersen, Suedergellersen and Reppenstedt forms the community of "Samtgemeinde Gellersen", whose administrative center is in Reppenstedt.

== Coat of arms ==
The central feature in the coat of arms is a building which still exists in the center of the old part of the village. The two-storey building was used originally as a storehouse for food and equipment and is the oldest building in the village. It is not absolutely certain when it was built but 1603 is generally accepted. In 1902, a nearby main farmhouse was set on fire by lightning. In order to rebuild the destroyed farmhouse, the storehouse had to be put on rollers and moved to the other side of the street where it stands today.
