= Boitze =

- Municipality
- Coat of arms

- Location of Boitze within Lüneburg district
- Interactive map of Boitze
- Location within Germany Location within Lower Saxony
- Coordinates: 53°09′N 10°45′E
- Country: Germany
- State: Lower Saxony
- District: Lüneburg
- Municipal assoc.: Dahlenburg

Government
  - Mayor: Richard Wiese

Area
  - Total: 25.41 km^{2} (9.81 sq mi)
- Elevation: 61 m (200 ft)

Population (2025-12-31)
  - Total: 331
  - Density: 13.0/km^{2} (33.7/sq mi)
- Time zone: UTC+01:00 (CET)
  - Summer (DST): UTC+02:00 (CEST)
- Postal codes: 21368
- Dialling codes: 05851
- Vehicle registration: LG

Boitze is a municipality in the district of Lüneburg, in Lower Saxony, Germany. Boitze has an area of 25.41 km² and a population of 416 (as of December 31, 2007).
