= Hohnstorf =

- Municipality
- Coat of arms

- Location of Hohnstorf within Lüneburg district
- Interactive map of Hohnstorf
- Location within Germany Location within Lower Saxony
- Coordinates: 53°22′N 10°33′E
- Country: Germany
- State: Lower Saxony
- District: Lüneburg
- Municipal assoc.: Scharnebeck
- Subdivisions: 2 Ortsteile

Government
  - Mayor: Dirk Lindemann (CDU)

Area
  - Total: 10.22 km^{2} (3.95 sq mi)
- Elevation: 4 m (13 ft)

Population (2025-12-31)
  - Total: 2,310
  - Density: 226/km^{2} (585/sq mi)
- Time zone: UTC+01:00 (CET)
  - Summer (DST): UTC+02:00 (CEST)
- Postal codes: 21522
- Dialling codes: 04139
- Vehicle registration: LG
- Website: https://www.hohnstorf.de/

Hohnstorf is a municipality in the district of Lüneburg, in Lower Saxony, Germany.
