= Radbruch =

- Municipality
- Coat of arms

- Location of Radbruch within Lüneburg district
- Interactive map of Radbruch
- Location within Germany Location within Lower Saxony
- Coordinates: 53°19′N 10°17′E
- Country: Germany
- State: Lower Saxony
- District: Lüneburg
- Municipal assoc.: Bardowick

Government
  - Mayor: Rolf Semrok (CDU)

Area
  - Total: 22.54 km^{2} (8.70 sq mi)
- Elevation: 8 m (26 ft)

Population (2025-12-31)
  - Total: 2,249
  - Density: 99.78/km^{2} (258.4/sq mi)
- Time zone: UTC+01:00 (CET)
  - Summer (DST): UTC+02:00 (CEST)
- Postal codes: 21449
- Dialling codes: 04178
- Vehicle registration: LG

Radbruch is a municipality in the district of Lüneburg, in Lower Saxony, Germany.
