= Eucratoscelus constrictus =

Scientific classification
- Kingdom: Animalia
- Phylum: Arthropoda
- Subphylum: Chelicerata
- Class: Arachnida
- Order: Araneae
- Infraorder: Mygalomorphae
- Family: Theraphosidae
- Genus: Eucratoscelus
- Species: E. constrictus

Binomial name
- Eucratoscelus constrictus Gerstäcker, 1873

Species of spider

Eucratoscelus constrictus is a species of tarantula belonging to the family Theraphosidae. They produce a venom that contains a group of neurotoxic peptides.
