= Michael Krüger (footballer) =

German football coach and former player (born 1954)

Personal information
- Date of birth: 28 May 1954 (age 72)
- Place of birth: Scharnebeck, West Germany
- Position: Striker

Senior career*
Years	Team	Apps	(Gls)
1972–1975	Hannover 96		
1975–1980	Arminia Hannover	130	(18)

Managerial career
- 1989: Schalke 04 (assistant)
- 1989–1990: Hannover 96
- 1991–1992: VfV Hildesheim
- 1992–1993: Hansa Rostock (assistant)
- 1994–1995: Holstein Kiel
- 1996–1997: El Mokawloon
- 1997: Samsunspor (assistant)
- 1998: Al-Masry
- 1999–2001: Kickers Emden
- 2001–2004: VfL Wolfsburg II
- 2004–2006: Eintracht Braunschweig
- 2007–2008: 1. FC Saarbrücken
- 2008–2009: Al-Merreikh SC
- 2009–2010: Alemannia Aachen
- 2010: Al-Merreikh SC
- 2012–2013: Saint George SA
- 2013–2014: Al-Merreikh SC
- 2014–2015: ENPPI Club
- 2015–2016: Hannover 96 II
- * Club domestic league appearances and goals

Michael Krüger (born 28 May 1954) is a German football coach and former player.

== Playing career ==
Krüger was born in Scharnebeck. He played for Arminia Hannover in the 2. Bundesliga.

== Coaching career ==
Krüger began his coaching career as assistant coach of Peter Neururer with FC Schalke 04. In September 1989, he was named as the new head coach of the 2. Bundesliga club Hannover 96, but was suspended after one year. In 1999, he worked one year lower league team VfV Hildesheim, before signing a contract as assistant coach of Erich Rutemöller at F.C. Hansa Rostock. In the 1994–95 season, Krüger took over the coaching job at Holstein Kiel. He then worked in Egypt, coaching Arab Contractors and winning the African Cup. One year later he led Al-Masry to win the Egyptian Cup against his former team Arab Contractors in 1998. In 1998, he returned to Germany and was named head coach of Kickers Emden and later took the same job at the second team of VfL Wolfsburg.

From 15 March 2004 on, Krüger was head coach of Eintracht Braunschweig and led the club back in the 2. Bundesliga in 2006. On 4 October 2006, Krüger was fired together with sporting director Wolfgang Loos by the Lower Saxon club. On 13 June 2007, Krüger was named as the new head coach of the Regionalliga relegated team 1. FC Saarbrücken, following the club's hiring of Wolfgang Loos in April 2007.

In January 2008, Krüger went back to Africa to coach Sudanese club Al-Merreikh, he led Al-Merreikh to win the Sudanese Premier League cup in November 2008 and the Sudan Cup in December 2008. Krüger signed on 21 September 2009 a contract as head coach with Alemannia Aachen and was just a half year later dismissed.

In the summer of 2010, he returned to the Sudanese club Al-Merreikh SC. In November 2010, he led the club to victory in the Sudanese Cup. After that he left the club.

In 2012, he became the manager of Ethiopia's Saint George SA. In 2013, he returned to Al-Merreikh in Sudan, but was fired after a loss against Uganda's Kampala City Council FC in the CAF Champions League in February 2014.

== Personal life ==
His full-time job is as a sports and geography teacher.

== Honours ==
- African Cups' Cup: 1996
- Egypt Cup: 1997–98
- Sudan Premier League: 2008
- Sudan Cup winner: 2008, 2010
