= Minicia elegans =

Scientific classification
- Kingdom: Animalia
- Phylum: Arthropoda
- Subphylum: Chelicerata
- Class: Arachnida
- Order: Araneae
- Infraorder: Araneomorphae
- Family: Linyphiidae
- Genus: Minicia
- Species: M. elegans

Binomial name
- Minicia elegans Simon, 1894

Species of spider

Minicia elegans is a species of spiders in the family Linyphiidae. It is found in Portugal and Algeria.
