= Reinstorf =

- Municipality
- Coat of arms

- Location of Reinstorf within Lüneburg district
- Interactive map of Reinstorf
- Location within Germany Location within Lower Saxony
- Coordinates: 53°14′04″N 10°34′10″E
- Country: Germany
- State: Lower Saxony
- District: Lüneburg
- Municipal assoc.: Ostheide

Government
  - Mayor: Burkhard Bisanz (SPD)

Area
  - Total: 30.29 km^{2} (11.70 sq mi)
- Elevation: 50 m (160 ft)

Population (2025-12-31)
  - Total: 1,174
  - Density: 38.76/km^{2} (100.4/sq mi)
- Time zone: UTC+01:00 (CET)
  - Summer (DST): UTC+02:00 (CEST)
- Postal codes: 21400
- Dialling codes: 04137
- Vehicle registration: LG

Reinstorf is a municipality in the district of Lüneburg, in Lower Saxony, Germany.
