= Wittorf =

- Municipality
- Coat of arms

- Location of Wittorf within Lüneburg district
- Interactive map of Wittorf
- Location within Germany Location within Lower Saxony
- Coordinates: 53°20′N 10°23′E
- Country: Germany
- State: Lower Saxony
- District: Lüneburg
- Municipal assoc.: Bardowick

Government
  - Mayor: Michael Herbst

Area
  - Total: 11.99 km^{2} (4.63 sq mi)
- Elevation: 4 m (13 ft)

Population (2025-12-31)
  - Total: 1,613
  - Density: 134.5/km^{2} (348.4/sq mi)
- Time zone: UTC+01:00 (CET)
  - Summer (DST): UTC+02:00 (CEST)
- Postal codes: 21357
- Dialling codes: 04133
- Vehicle registration: LG

Wittorf is a municipality in the district of Lüneburg, in Lower Saxony, Germany.
