= Barendorf =

- Municipality
- Coat of arms

- Location of Barendorf within Lüneburg district
- Interactive map of Barendorf
- Location within Germany Location within Lower Saxony
- Coordinates: 53°13′28″N 10°31′14″E
- Country: Germany
- State: Lower Saxony
- District: Lüneburg
- Municipal assoc.: Ostheide

Government
  - Mayor: Bernd Hein

Area
  - Total: 9.31 km^{2} (3.59 sq mi)
- Elevation: 74 m (243 ft)

Population (2025-12-31)
  - Total: 2,424
  - Density: 260/km^{2} (674/sq mi)
- Time zone: UTC+01:00 (CET)
  - Summer (DST): UTC+02:00 (CEST)
- Postal codes: 21397
- Dialling codes: 04137
- Vehicle registration: LG
- Website: www.barendorf.info

Barendorf (German pronunciation: [ˈbaːʁəndɔʁf]) is a municipality in the district of Lüneburg, in Lower Saxony, Germany. Barendorf has an area of 9.24 km^{2} and a population of 2,344 (as of December 31, 2007).
