= Vastorf =

- Municipality
- Coat of arms

- Location of Vastorf within Lüneburg district
- Interactive map of Vastorf
- Location within Germany Location within Lower Saxony
- Coordinates: 53°12′N 10°33′E
- Country: Germany
- State: Lower Saxony
- District: Lüneburg
- Municipal assoc.: Ostheide
- Subdivisions: 4

Government
  - Mayor: Herbert Wulf

Area
  - Total: 21.85 km^{2} (8.44 sq mi)
- Elevation: 62 m (203 ft)

Population (2025-12-31)
  - Total: 828
  - Density: 37.9/km^{2} (98.1/sq mi)
- Time zone: UTC+01:00 (CET)
  - Summer (DST): UTC+02:00 (CEST)
- Postal codes: 21397
- Dialling codes: 04137
- Vehicle registration: LG
- Website: Website of the municipality

Vastorf is a municipality in the district of Lüneburg, in Lower Saxony, Germany.
