= Südergellersen =

- Municipality
- Coat of arms

- Location of Südergellersen within Lüneburg district
- Interactive map of Südergellersen
- Location within Germany Location within Lower Saxony
- Coordinates: 53°13′N 10°18′E
- Country: Germany
- State: Lower Saxony
- District: Lüneburg
- Municipal assoc.: Gellersen

Government
  - Mayor: Annette Kammeier (CDU)
  - Governing parties: CDU/ SPD

Area
  - Total: 18.46 km^{2} (7.13 sq mi)
- Elevation: 44 m (144 ft)

Population (2025-12-31)
  - Total: 1,549
  - Density: 83.91/km^{2} (217.3/sq mi)
- Time zone: UTC+01:00 (CET)
  - Summer (DST): UTC+02:00 (CEST)
- Postal codes: 21394
- Dialling codes: 04135
- Vehicle registration: LG
- Website: suedergellersen.de

Südergellersen is a municipality in the district of Lüneburg, in Lower Saxony, Germany.

== Localities ==
- Heiligenthal
