= Gellersen =

Samtgemeinde in Lower Saxony

- Samtgemeinde
- Location of Gellersen within Lüneburg district
- Interactive map of Gellersen
- Location within Germany Location within Lower Saxony
- Coordinates: 53°15′N 10°21′E
- Country: Germany
- State: Lower Saxony
- District: Lüneburg
- Founded: 1974
- Seat: Reppenstedt
- Subdivisions: 4 municipalities

Area
  - Total: 73.83 km^{2} (28.51 sq mi)

Population (2025-12-31)
  - Total: 12,898
  - Density: 174.7/km^{2} (452.5/sq mi)
- Time zone: UTC+01:00 (CET)
  - Summer (DST): UTC+02:00 (CEST)
- Website: www.gellersen.de

Gellersen is a Samtgemeinde ("collective municipality") in the district of Lüneburg, in Lower Saxony, Germany. Established in 1974, Samtgemeinde Gellersen consists of the municipalities Reppenstedt, Kirchgellersen, Westergellersen and Südergellersen. The seat is in the village Reppenstedt. As of 31 December 2024, it had a population of 12,856.
