= Neetze =

- Municipality
- Coat of arms

- Location of Neetze within Lüneburg district
- Interactive map of Neetze
- Location within Germany Location within Lower Saxony
- Coordinates: 53°16′N 10°38′E
- Country: Germany
- State: Lower Saxony
- District: Lüneburg
- Municipal assoc.: Ostheide
- Subdivisions: 4

Government
  - Mayor: Heinz Hagemann (SPD)

Area
  - Total: 26.86 km^{2} (10.37 sq mi)
- Elevation: 37 m (121 ft)

Population (2025-12-31)
  - Total: 2,860
  - Density: 106/km^{2} (276/sq mi)
- Time zone: UTC+01:00 (CET)
  - Summer (DST): UTC+02:00 (CEST)
- Postal codes: 21398
- Dialling codes: 05850
- Vehicle registration: LG
- Website: Webseite der Samtgemeinde

Neetze (German pronunciation: [ˈneːtsə]) is a municipality in the district of Lüneburg, in Lower Saxony, Germany.
