= Echem =

- Municipality
- Coat of arms

- Location of Echem within Lüneburg district
- Interactive map of Echem
- Location within Germany Location within Lower Saxony
- Coordinates: 53°19′N 10°32′E
- Country: Germany
- State: Lower Saxony
- District: Lüneburg
- Municipal assoc.: Scharnebeck

Government
  - Mayor: Steffen Schmitter

Area
  - Total: 10.72 km^{2} (4.14 sq mi)
- Elevation: 3 m (9.8 ft)

Population (2025-12-31)
  - Total: 1,070
  - Density: 99.8/km^{2} (259/sq mi)
- Time zone: UTC+01:00 (CET)
  - Summer (DST): UTC+02:00 (CEST)
- Postal codes: 21379
- Dialling codes: 04139
- Vehicle registration: LG

Echem is a municipality in the district of Lüneburg, in Lower Saxony, Germany. Echem has an area of 10.72 km² and a population of 1,021 (as of December 31, 2007).
