= Melbeck =

- Municipality
- Coat of arms

- Location of Melbeck within Lüneburg district
- Interactive map of Melbeck
- Location within Germany Location within Lower Saxony
- Coordinates: 53°10′48″N 10°24′00″E
- Country: Germany
- State: Lower Saxony
- District: Lüneburg

Government
  - Mayor: Klaus Hübner (CDU)

Area
  - Total: 16.17 km^{2} (6.24 sq mi)
- Elevation: 21 m (69 ft)

Population (2025-12-31)
  - Total: 3,295
  - Density: 203.8/km^{2} (527.8/sq mi)
- Time zone: UTC+01:00 (CET)
  - Summer (DST): UTC+02:00 (CEST)
- Postal codes: 21406
- Dialling codes: 04134
- Vehicle registration: LG
- Website: Website der Samtgemeinde

Melbeck is a municipality in the district of Lüneburg, in Lower Saxony, Germany.
