= Dahlenburg (Samtgemeinde) =

Samtgemeinde in Lower Saxony

- Samtgemeinde
- Location of Dahlenburg within Lüneburg district
- Interactive map of Dahlenburg
- Location within Germany Location within Lower Saxony
- Coordinates: 53°12′N 10°40′E
- Country: Germany
- State: Lower Saxony
- District: Lüneburg
- Seat: Dahlenburg
- Subdivisions: 5 municipalities

Area
  - Total: 156.52 km^{2} (60.43 sq mi)

Population (2025-12-31)
  - Total: 5,582
  - Density: 35.66/km^{2} (92.37/sq mi)
- Time zone: UTC+01:00 (CET)
  - Summer (DST): UTC+02:00 (CEST)
- Website: www.dahlenburg.de

Dahlenburg is a Samtgemeinde ("collective municipality") in the district of Lüneburg, in Lower Saxony, Germany. Its seat is in the village Dahlenburg.

The Samtgemeinde Dahlenburg consists of the following municipalities:

1. Boitze
2. Dahlem
3. Dahlenburg
4. Nahrendorf
5. Tosterglope
