= Scharnebeck =

- Municipality
- Coat of arms

- Location of Scharnebeck within Lüneburg district
- Interactive map of Scharnebeck
- Location within Germany Location within Lower Saxony
- Coordinates: 53°18′N 10°31′E
- Country: Germany
- State: Lower Saxony
- District: Lüneburg
- Municipal assoc.: Scharnebeck

Government
  - Mayor: Hans-Georg Führinger (CDU)

Area
  - Total: 26.88 km^{2} (10.38 sq mi)
- Elevation: 7 m (23 ft)

Population (2025-12-31)
  - Total: 3,463
  - Density: 128.8/km^{2} (333.7/sq mi)
- Time zone: UTC+01:00 (CET)
  - Summer (DST): UTC+02:00 (CEST)
- Postal codes: 21379
- Dialling codes: 04136
- Vehicle registration: LG
- Website: www.gemeinde-scharnebeck.de

Scharnebeck is a municipality in the district of Lüneburg, in Lower Saxony, Germany. It is situated approximately 10 kilometres (6.2 mi) northeast of Lüneburg. The Scharnebeck twin ship lift on the Elbe Lateral Canal is in the municipality.

Scharnebeck is also the seat of the Samtgemeinde ("collective municipality") Scharnebeck.
