= Ostheide =

- Samtgemeinde
- Coat of arms

- Location of Ostheide within Lüneburg district
- Interactive map of Ostheide
- Location within Germany Location within Lower Saxony
- Coordinates: 53°14′N 10°31′E
- Country: Germany
- State: Lower Saxony
- District: Lüneburg
- Subdivisions: 6 municipalities

Government
  - Mayor (2021–26): Norbert Meyer (SPD)

Area
  - Total: 129.78 km^{2} (50.11 sq mi)

Population (2025-12-31)
  - Total: 10,353
  - Density: 79.773/km^{2} (206.61/sq mi)
- Time zone: UTC+01:00 (CET)
  - Summer (DST): UTC+02:00 (CEST)
- Postal codes: 21397–21403
- Vehicle registration: LG
- Website: www.ostheide.de

Ostheide is a Samtgemeinde ("collective municipality") in the district of Lüneburg, in Lower Saxony, Germany. It is situated approximately 8 kilometres (5.0 mi) east of Lüneburg. Its seat is in the village Barendorf.

== Division of the municipality ==
The Samtgemeinde Ostheide consists of the following municipalities:

1. Barendorf
2. Neetze
3. Reinstorf
4. Thomasburg
5. Vastorf
6. Wendisch Evern
