= Kirchgellersen =

- Municipality
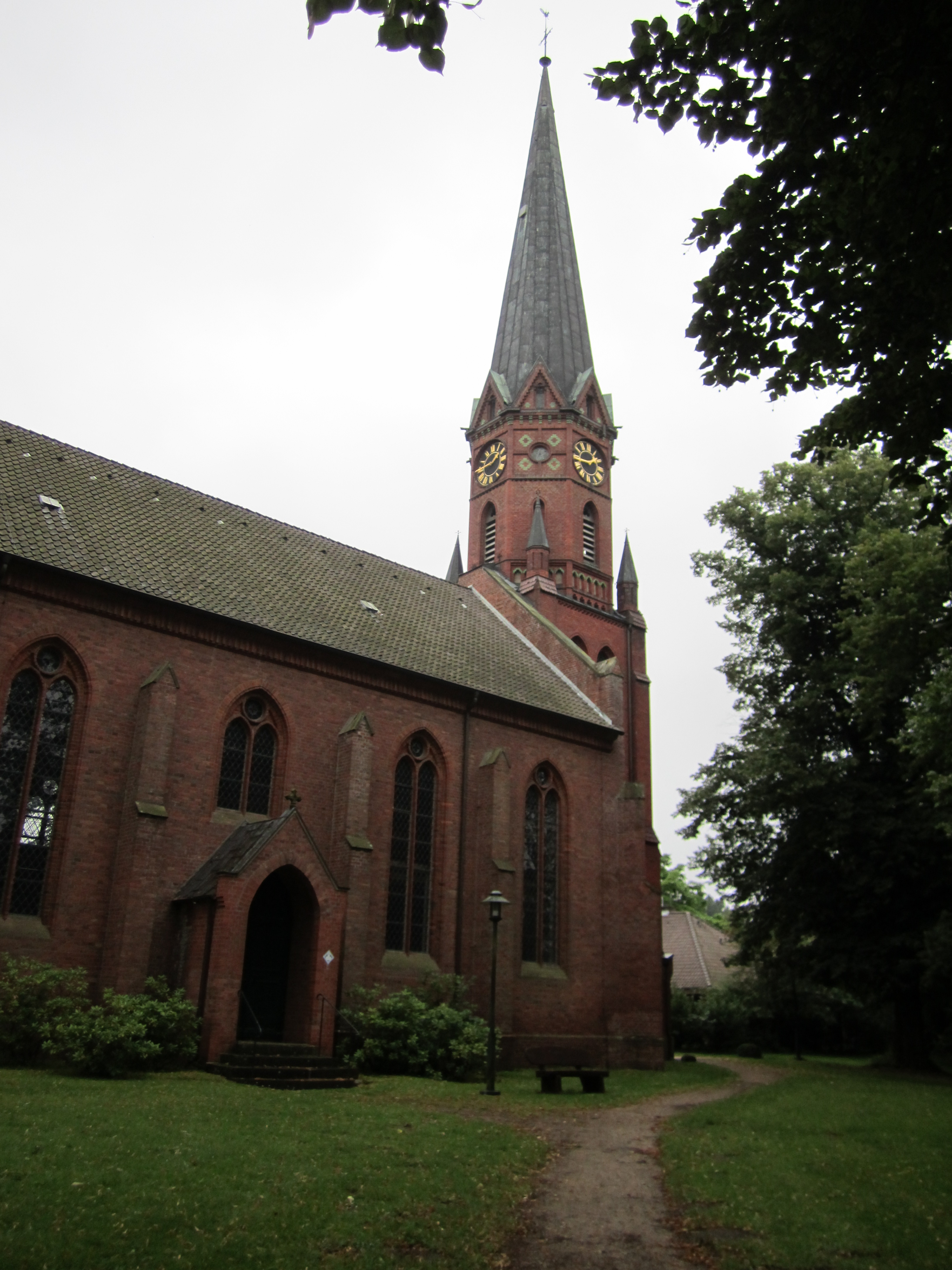
- Church of Saint Lawrence

- Coat of arms

- Location of Kirchgellersen within Lüneburg district
- Interactive map of Kirchgellersen
- Location within Germany Location within Lower Saxony
- Coordinates: 53°14′N 10°18′E
- Country: Germany
- State: Lower Saxony
- District: Lüneburg
- Municipal assoc.: Gellersen

Government
  - Mayor: Jürgen Hövermann (CDU)

Area
  - Total: 19.99 km^{2} (7.72 sq mi)
- Elevation: 38 m (125 ft)

Population (2025-12-31)
  - Total: 2,337
  - Density: 116.9/km^{2} (302.8/sq mi)
- Time zone: UTC+01:00 (CET)
  - Summer (DST): UTC+02:00 (CEST)
- Postal codes: 21394
- Dialling codes: 04135
- Vehicle registration: LG
- Website: www.kirchgellersen.de

Kirchgellersen is a municipality in the district of Lüneburg, in Lower Saxony, Germany.
