= Thomasburg =

- Municipality
- Coat of arms

- Location of Thomasburg within Lüneburg district
- Interactive map of Thomasburg
- Location within Germany Location within Lower Saxony
- Coordinates: 53°14′N 10°40′E
- Country: Germany
- State: Lower Saxony
- District: Lüneburg
- Municipal assoc.: Ostheide
- Subdivisions: 5 Ortsteile

Government
  - Mayor: Dieter Schröder (SPD)

Area
  - Total: 26.69 km^{2} (10.31 sq mi)
- Elevation: 54 m (177 ft)

Population (2025-12-31)
  - Total: 1,318
  - Density: 49.38/km^{2} (127.9/sq mi)
- Time zone: UTC+01:00 (CET)
  - Summer (DST): UTC+02:00 (CEST)
- Postal codes: 21401
- Dialling codes: 05859
- Vehicle registration: LG

Thomasburg is a municipality in the district of Lüneburg, in Lower Saxony, Germany.
