= Dahlenburg =

- Municipality
- Coat of arms

- Location of Dahlenburg within Lüneburg district
- Interactive map of Dahlenburg
- Location within Germany Location within Lower Saxony
- Coordinates: 53°11′N 10°45′E
- Country: Germany
- State: Lower Saxony
- District: Lüneburg
- Municipal assoc.: Dahlenburg

Government
  - Mayor: Arnfried Pischke

Area
  - Total: 49.85 km^{2} (19.25 sq mi)
- Elevation: 42 m (138 ft)

Population (2025-12-31)
  - Total: 3,047
  - Density: 61.12/km^{2} (158.3/sq mi)
- Time zone: UTC+01:00 (CET)
  - Summer (DST): UTC+02:00 (CEST)
- Postal codes: 21368
- Dialling codes: 05851
- Vehicle registration: LG
- Website: Samtgemeinde

Dahlenburg is a municipality in the district of Lüneburg, in Lower Saxony, Germany. It is approximately 25 km (16 mi) east of Lüneburg. Dahlenburg has a population of 3,449 (as of December 31, 2007).

Dahlenburg is also the seat of the Samtgemeinde ("collective municipality") Dahlenburg.

== Twin towns ==
Le Molay-Littry, France
