= Scharnebeck (Samtgemeinde) =

- Samtgemeinde
- Coat of arms

- Location of Scharnebeck within Lüneburg district
- Interactive map of Scharnebeck
- Location within Germany Location within Lower Saxony
- Coordinates: 53°18′N 10°31′E
- Country: Germany
- State: Lower Saxony
- District: Lüneburg

Government
  - Mayor (2019–24): Laars Gerstenkorn (CDU)

Area
  - Total: 26.88 km^{2} (10.38 sq mi)
- Elevation: 7 m (23 ft)

Population (2025-12-31)
  - Total: 15,549
  - Density: 578.5/km^{2} (1,498/sq mi)
- Time zone: UTC+01:00 (CET)
  - Summer (DST): UTC+02:00 (CEST)
- Postal codes: 21379
- Dialling codes: 04136
- Vehicle registration: LG
- Website: www.scharnebeck.de

Scharnebeck is a Samtgemeinde ("collective municipality") in the district of Lüneburg, in Lower Saxony, Germany. Its seat is in the village Scharnebeck.

== Division of the municipality ==
The Samtgemeinde Scharnebeck consists of the following municipalities:

1. Artlenburg
2. Brietlingen
3. Echem
4. Hittbergen
5. Hohnstorf
6. Lüdersburg
7. Rullstorf
8. Scharnebeck
