= Bardowick (Samtgemeinde) =

- Samtgemeinde
- Coat of arms

- Location of Bardowick within Lüneburg district
- Interactive map of Bardowick
- Location within Germany Location within Lower Saxony
- Coordinates: 53°18′02″N 10°23′25″E
- Country: Germany
- State: Lower Saxony
- District: Lüneburg
- Founded: 1969
- Subdivisions: 7 municipalities

Government
  - Mayor (2019–24): Heiner Luhmann (CDU)

Area
  - Total: 100.16 km^{2} (38.67 sq mi)
- Elevation: 8 m (26 ft)

Population (2025-12-31)
  - Total: 17,618
  - Density: 175.90/km^{2} (455.58/sq mi)
- Time zone: UTC+01:00 (CET)
  - Summer (DST): UTC+02:00 (CEST)
- Postal codes: 21357
- Dialling codes: 04131
- Vehicle registration: LG
- Website: www.samtgemeinde-bardowick.de

Bardowick is a Samtgemeinde ("collective municipality") in the district of Lüneburg, in Lower Saxony, Germany. Its seat is in the village Bardowick.

The Samtgemeinde Bardowick consists of the following municipalities:

- Bardowick
- Barum
- Handorf
- Mechtersen
- Radbruch
- Vögelsen
- Wittorf
