= Adendorf =

- Municipality
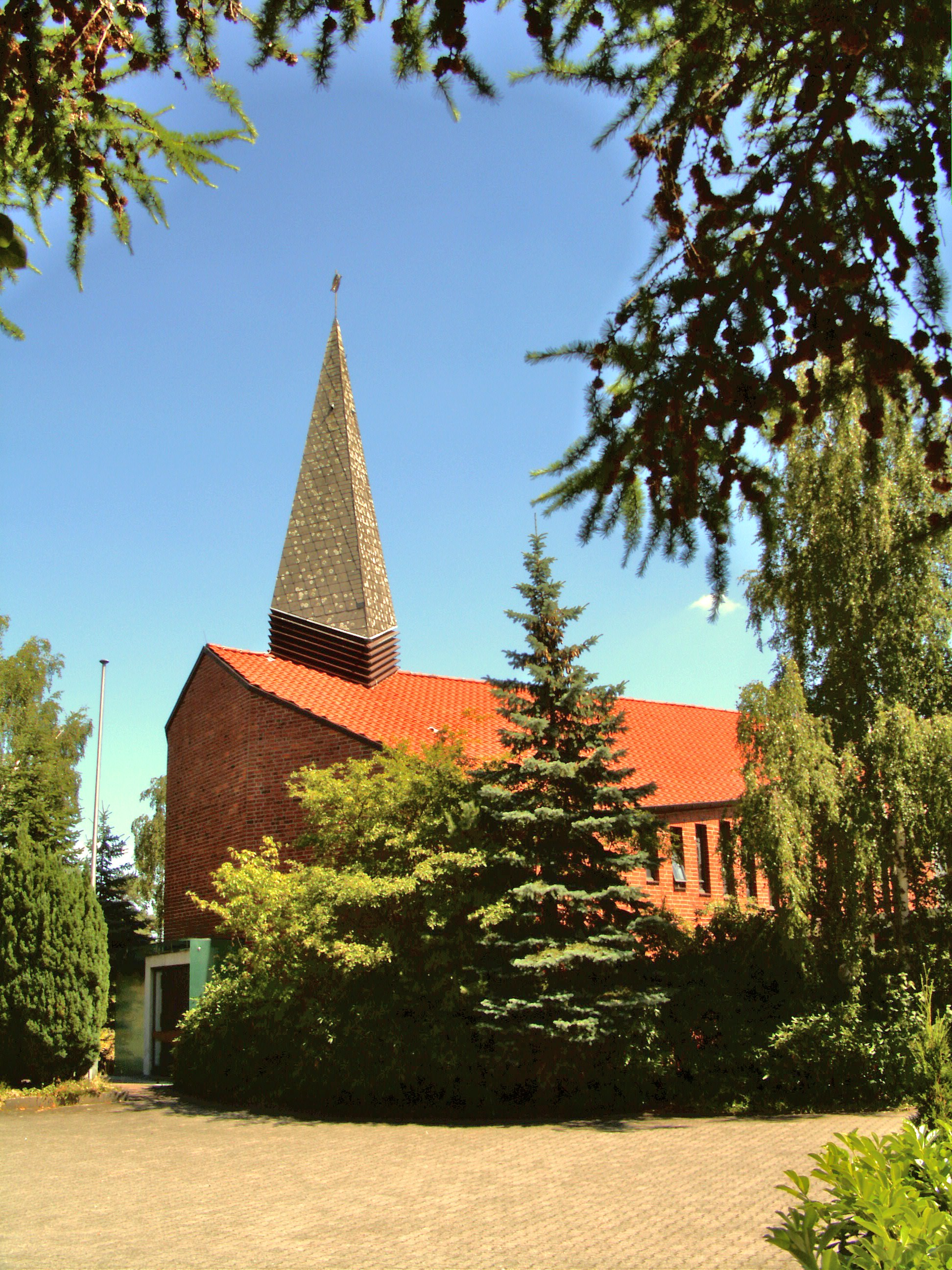
- Church of Christ the King

- Coat of arms

- Location of Adendorf within Lüneburg district
- Interactive map of Adendorf
- Location within Germany Location within Lower Saxony
- Coordinates: 53°17′N 10°27′E
- Country: Germany
- State: Lower Saxony
- District: Lüneburg
- Subdivisions: 4 districts

Government
  - Mayor (2019–24): Thomas Maack (SPD)

Area
  - Total: 16.08 km^{2} (6.21 sq mi)
- Elevation: 23 m (75 ft)

Population (2025-12-31)
  - Total: 10,795
  - Density: 671.3/km^{2} (1,739/sq mi)
- Time zone: UTC+01:00 (CET)
  - Summer (DST): UTC+02:00 (CEST)
- Postal codes: 21365
- Dialling codes: 04131
- Vehicle registration: LG
- Website: www.adendorf.de

Adendorf (Northern Low Saxon: Adendörp) is a municipality in the district of Lüneburg, in Lower Saxony, Germany.

== Twin towns ==
Adendorf is twinned with:

- Saint-Romain-de-Colbosc, France, since 1987
- Wągrowiec, Poland, since 2001
