= Embsen =

- Municipality
- Coat of arms

- Location of Embsen within Lüneburg district
- Interactive map of Embsen
- Location within Germany Location within Lower Saxony
- Coordinates: 53°11′N 10°21′E
- Country: Germany
- State: Lower Saxony
- District: Lüneburg
- Subdivisions: 3

Government
  - Mayor: Anne-Carin Büttner

Area
  - Total: 22.66 km^{2} (8.75 sq mi)
- Elevation: 44 m (144 ft)

Population (2025-12-31)
  - Total: 2,762
  - Density: 121.9/km^{2} (315.7/sq mi)
- Time zone: UTC+01:00 (CET)
  - Summer (DST): UTC+02:00 (CEST)
- Postal codes: 21409
- Dialling codes: 04134
- Vehicle registration: LG
- Website: www.embsen.de

Embsen is a municipality in the district of Lüneburg, in Niedersachsen, Germany.
