= Lüneburg (district) =

District in Lower Saxony, Germany

Coordinates: 53°15′N 10°30′E

- District
- Flag Coat of arms
- Country: Germany
- State: Lower Saxony
- Capital: Lüneburg

Area
  - Total: 1,323.1 km^{2} (510.9 sq mi)

Population (31 December 2024)
  - Total: 179,448
  - Density: 135.63/km^{2} (351.27/sq mi)
- Time zone: UTC+01:00 (CET)
  - Summer (DST): UTC+02:00 (CEST)
- Vehicle registration: LG
- Website: lueneburg.de

Lüneburg is a district in Lower Saxony, Germany. It is bounded by (from the southeast and clockwise) the districts of Lüchow-Dannenberg, Uelzen, Heidekreis and Harburg, and the states of Schleswig-Holstein (district of Lauenburg) and Mecklenburg-Western Pomerania (district of Ludwigslust-Parchim).

== History ==
The Amt of Lüneburg appeared in 1862. At that time the Amt of Lüne moved its seat from Lüne Abbey into the Lüneburg Riding Academy and its name was changed. The district was established after the Kingdom of Hanover was annexed by Prussia in 1866. From 1867 the Ämter of Lüneburg, Bleckede and the town of Lüneburg became parts of the district of Lüneburg, which was exclusively responsible for taxes and the military.

The history of the region has always been influenced by the town of Lüneburg: see there for more details.

In 1993 the municipality of Amt Neuhaus joined Lower Saxony and the District of Lüneburg. This region had always been ruled by Lüneburg before the division of Germany made it a part of East Germany after 1945. It is hence one of the very few municipalities of the former East Germany that are now in a state that was formerly in West Germany.

The district is one of the core areas for monuments and archaeological discoveries from prehistory. Ernst Sprockhoff noted 17 sites west of the Ilmenau and 32 east of it. The most outstanding are the sites of the Soderstorf Necropolis and the Oldendorfer Totenstatt.

== Geography ==
The district is characterised by the Lüneburg Heath (Lüneburger Heide) in the south and the riverside woodlands along the Elbe. Though most of the district is located south of the river, there is a small portion around the municipality of Amt Neuhaus on the opposite side.

== Coat of arms ==
The coat of arms displays:

- the heraldic lion of the Duchy of Brunswick-Lüneburg
- the hearts of the Danish national arms (since Duke Wilhelm of Lüneburg was married to a Danish princess in the 14th century)

== Towns and municipalities ==
Clickable map of towns and municipalities in the district

Towns	Samtgemeinden
1. Bleckede; 2. Lüneburg; Free municipalities: 1. Adendorf; 2. Amt Neuhaus	1. Amelinghausen; 1. Amelinghausen^{1}; 2. Betzendorf; 3. Oldendorf (Luhe); 4. Rehlingen; 5. Soderstorf; 2. Bardowick; 1. Bardowick^{1}; 2. Barum; 3. Handorf; 4. Mechtersen; 5. Radbruch; 6. Vögelsen; 7. Wittorf	3. Dahlenburg; 1. Boitze; 2. Dahlem; 3. Dahlenburg^{1}; 4. Nahrendorf; 5. Tosterglope; 4. Gellersen; 1. Kirchgellersen; 2. Reppenstedt^{1}; 3. Südergellersen; 4. Westergellersen; 5. Ilmenau; 1. Barnstedt; 2. Deutsch Evern; 3. Embsen; 4. Melbeck^{1}	6. Ostheide; 1. Barendorf^{1}; 2. Neetze; 3. Reinstorf; 4. Thomasburg; 5. Vastorf; 6. Wendisch Evern; 7. Scharnebeck; 1. Artlenburg; 2. Brietlingen; 3. Echem; 4. Hittbergen; 5. Hohnstorf; 6. Lüdersburg; 7. Rullstorf; 8. Scharnebeck^{1}
	^{1}seat of the Samtgemeinde

== Transport ==
Logo of the transport association HVV

The district is located in the area of the public transport association Hamburger Verkehrsverbund (HVV).
