= Artlenburg =

- Municipality
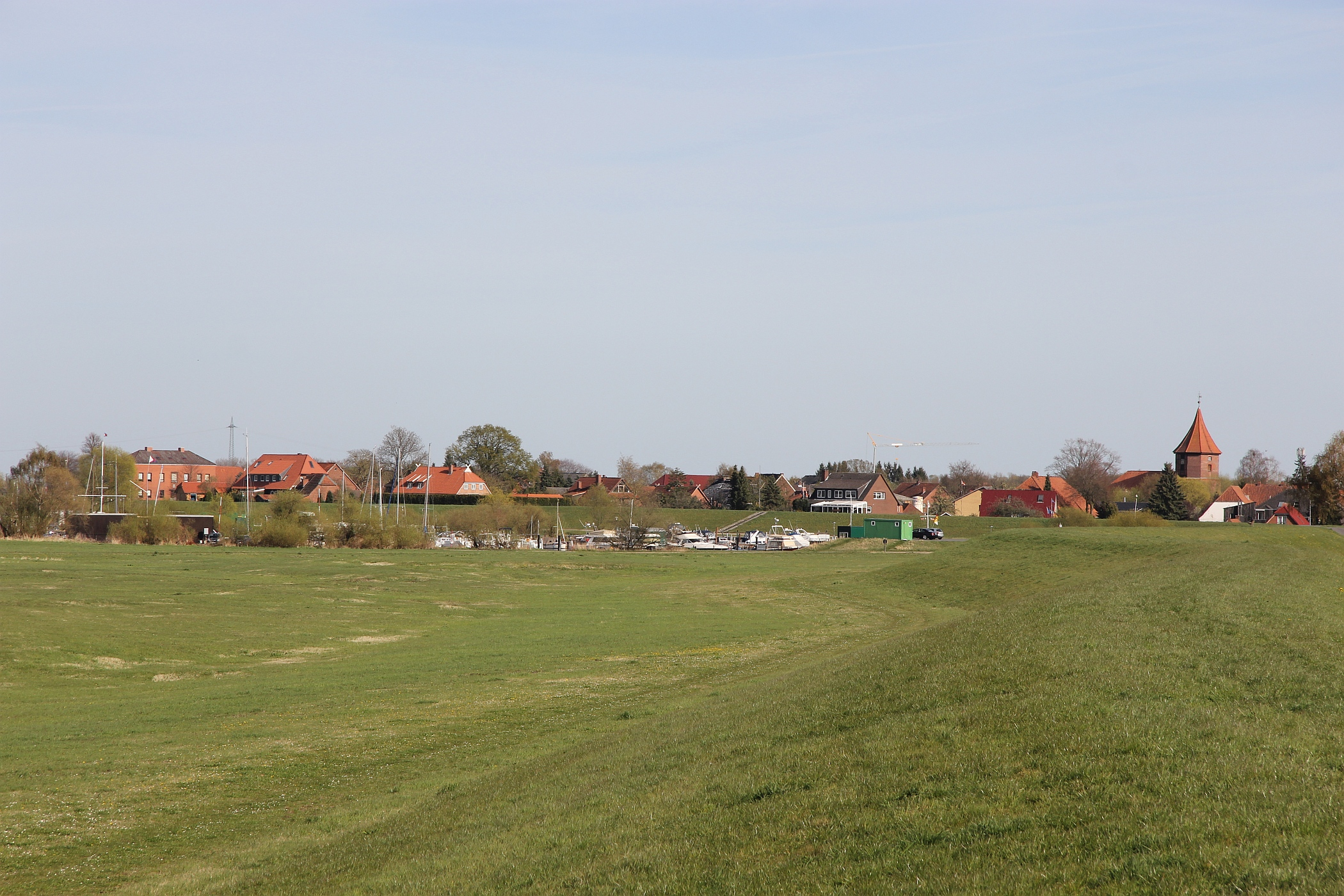
- Artlenburg

- Coat of arms

- Location of Artlenburg within Lüneburg district
- Interactive map of Artlenburg
- Location within Germany Location within Lower Saxony
- Coordinates: 53°22′31″N 10°29′21″E
- Country: Germany
- State: Lower Saxony
- District: Lüneburg
- Municipal assoc.: Scharnebeck

Government
  - Mayor: Rolf Twesten (CDU)

Area
  - Total: 11.85 km^{2} (4.58 sq mi)
- Elevation: 4 m (13 ft)

Population (2025-12-31)
  - Total: 1,786
  - Density: 150.7/km^{2} (390.4/sq mi)
- Time zone: UTC+01:00 (CET)
  - Summer (DST): UTC+02:00 (CEST)
- Postal codes: 21380
- Dialling codes: 04139
- Vehicle registration: LG
- Website: Website der Samtgemeinde

Artlenburg is a municipality in the district of Lüneburg, in Lower Saxony, in northern Germany. Artlenburg has an area of 11.85 km^{2} and a population of 1,619 (as of December 31, 2007).

== History ==
During the final stages of World War II, on 19 March 1945, Artlenburg was the site of a stopover during the German-organised march of Polish prisoners of war from the Oflag II-D camp to the Stalag X-B camp.
