= Deutsch Evern =

- Municipality
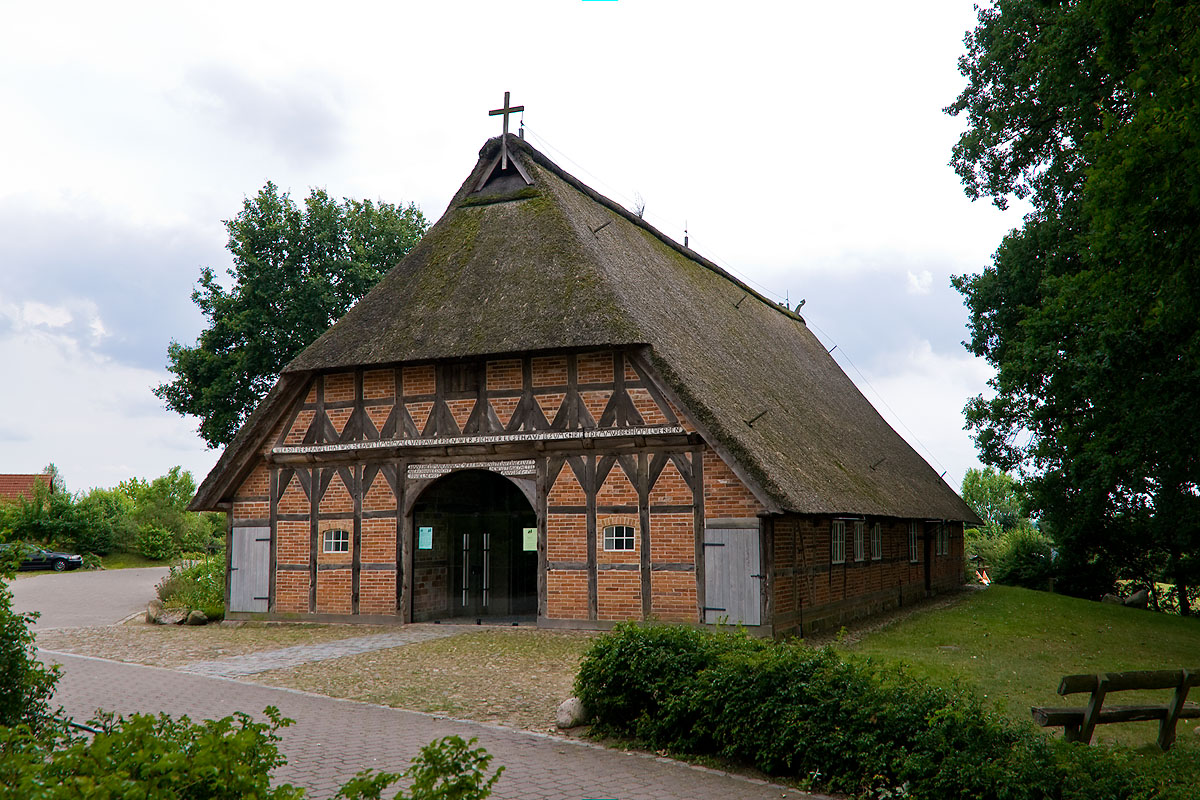
- Saint Martin Church

- Coat of arms

- Location of Deutsch Evern within Lüneburg district
- Interactive map of Deutsch Evern
- Location within Germany Location within Lower Saxony
- Coordinates: 53°12′N 10°26′E
- Country: Germany
- State: Lower Saxony
- District: Lüneburg

Government
  - Mayor: Ulrike Walter (CDU)

Area
  - Total: 11.16 km^{2} (4.31 sq mi)
- Elevation: 31 m (102 ft)

Population (2025-12-31)
  - Total: 3,655
  - Density: 327.5/km^{2} (848.2/sq mi)
- Time zone: UTC+01:00 (CET)
  - Summer (DST): UTC+02:00 (CEST)
- Postal codes: 21407
- Dialling codes: 04131
- Vehicle registration: LG

Deutsch Evern is a municipality in the district of Lüneburg, in Lower Saxony, Germany. Deutsch Evern has an area of 11.16 km^{2} and a population of 3,683 (as of December 31, 2007).
