= Günter Schmidt =

German arachnologist (1926–2016)

Günter E. W. Schmidt
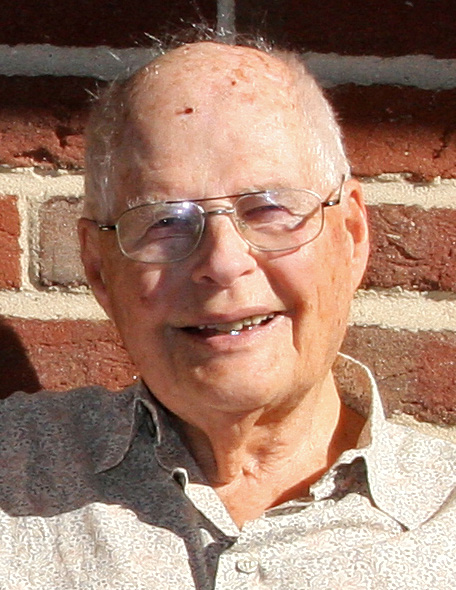
- Born: 10 May 1926; Lübeck
- Died: 23 December 2016 (aged 90); Deutsch Evern
- Scientific career
- Fields: Arachnology

Günter E. W. Schmidt (born 10 May 1926 in Lübeck; died 23 December 2016 in Deutsch Evern) was a German arachnologist and author of a standard German work on tarantulas, Die Vogelspinnen ("bird-eating spiders"). He has been described as one of the fathers of German arachnology.

He studied biology and mostly worked in the pharmaceutical industry until his retirement. In 1975, he graduated with a PhD thesis on the arachnid fauna of the Canary Islands. From 1986, his scientific work was concentrated mainly on tarantulas. The World Spider Catalog lists 234 species names of which he is the author or co-author (not all currently accepted), of which 69 are in the family Theraphosidae (tarantulas).

== Books ==
His books include:

- Schmidt, Günter (1986), Vogelspinnen : Lebensweise, Bestimmungsschlüssel, Haltung und Zucht, Minden: A. Philler, ISBN 978-3-7907-5001-0; followed by further editions, including Schmidt, Günter (1993), Vogelspinnen : Vorkommen, Lebensweise, Haltung und Zucht, mit Bestimmungsschlüsseln für alle Gattungen, Hannover: Landbuch, ISBN 978-3-7842-0484-0
- Schmidt, Günter (2000), Giftige und gefährliche Spinnentiere, Westarp Wissenschaften, ISBN 978-3-89432-405-6
- Schmidt, G. (2003), Die Vogelspinnen: Eine weltweite Übersicht, Neue Brehm-Bücherei, Hohenwarsleben: Westarp Wissenschaften, ISBN 978-3-89432-899-3

== Species names ==
Several species names of spiders honour Günter Schmidt, including:

- Haplopelma schmidti von Wirth, 1991 (now Cyriopagopus schmidti)
- Aphonopelma schmidti Smith, 1995 (now a synonym of Aphonopelma chalcodes)
- Cyrtopholis schmidti Rudloff, 1996
