= Bombing of Lüneburg =

World War II bombing attacks

Bombing of Lüneburg during World War II
- Part of Strategic bombing during World War II
Date	1940–1945
Location	Lüneburg
Result	Minor destruction; 270 homes were destroyed, 608 deaths

Belligerents
United States	Germany

Strength
19 bombing raids	

The bombing of Lüneburg were a series of aerial bombing attacks on the city of Lüneburg during World War II. A total of 19 air raids were carried out by the British Royal Air Force and United States Army Air Forces between 1940 and 1945 on the city and nearby industrial targets as part of the Allied campaign of strategic bombing of Germany, but unlike the bigger cities nearby like Hamburg and Lübeck, the city itself miraculously escaped major damage.

== Background ==
While Lüneburg was a smaller and less relevant target compared to the bigger cities nearby, it nonetheless had a population of 35,239 in May 1939. In addition, the city had a freight station and its own airfield in the north of the city that was used by the Luftwaffe.

== Attacks ==
The first of 19 air raids on Lüneburg occurred on the night of 20 to 21 July 1940, when the Lüneburg airfield and the Im Grimm district were hit by bombs dropped by the R.A.F. A year later, the second attack happened. On the night of 12 to 13 August 1941, bombs were dropped on the city, destroying several houses in the Im Grimm district, damaging others and injuring two people.

In 1944, three more attacks, by the U.S.A.A.F., occurred. During a night raid on 2 April 1944, several scattered bombs hit Lüneburg, killing two and destroying two residential buildings in Bleckeder Landstraße and on Lüner Weg. On 18 April, the Lüneburg airbase was attacked by midday by around 30 aircraft at midday and considerably damaged, but remained operational. In total, one hangar was badly damaged and three others were slightly damaged. Four aircraft, an engine house, several accommodation buildings, the airfield railway station and a residential building on the edge of the airfield were completely destroyed. On 18 June, the 392d Bombardment Group targeted Lüneburg and Bremerhaven as part of mission 113. A few months later, a residential area at the Bardowicker Wasserweg in the northern district of Goseburg was hit by several bombs in the afternoon, miraculously causing no injuries or deaths.

On 3 February 1945, several bombs fell on the goods station around midday, possibly as a result of an emergency airdrop. The raid caused moderate material damage.

The biggest and most destructive bombing on Lüneburg took place on 22 February. Between 10:10 and 14:15, 39 airplanes bombed the city and its surroundings. As a result, multiple trenches near the Lüneburg station and the station's air raid shelter were hit by bombs, killing a total 350 people. The railway bridge over the Dahlenburger Landstraße also collapsed. The houses around the railway station were severely damaged or completely destroyed. In Wandrahmstraße, the Lüneburg Museum, whose holdings had not been completely removed, was completely destroyed. Furthermore, the terminus of the Lüneburg-Bleckede railway line, the marshalling yard, a dairy on Lüner Weg and a factory in the Am Schwalbenberg street were severely damaged. A second big raid happened on 7 April 1945 with 13 aircraft. The target was once more the railway station and its surroundings, where a train with 400 prisoners from the Alter Banter Weg satellite camp near Wilhelmshaven, who were to be taken to Neuengamme, was parked. Because the prisoners were locked in the carriages, they were unable to flee when the bombs fell, killing 256 in total. The goods station was completely destroyed, as were the waterworks and the Wachsbleiche factory. The teachers' seminar on Wilschenbrucher Weg, which housed an auxiliary hospital and was then used by the Leuphana University of Lüneburg, was badly damaged by a direct bomb hit, as was the auxiliary hospital Zur Hasenburg on Soltauer Straße. Many bombs also hit the Rote Feld, which was still largely undeveloped at the time.

In the outskirts of the city, the unconditional surrender of the three German armies operating in Northwest Germany was signed at Lüneburg Heath. The location is presently inaccessible to the general public as it lies within a military out-of-bounds area. Only a small monument on a nearby track alludes to the event. On 23 May 1945, Reichsführer SS Heinrich Himmler also took his own life in Lüneburg whilst in British Army custody by biting into a potassium cyanide capsule embedded in his teeth before he could be properly interrogated. He was subsequently buried in an unmarked location in a nearby forest.

== After the war ==
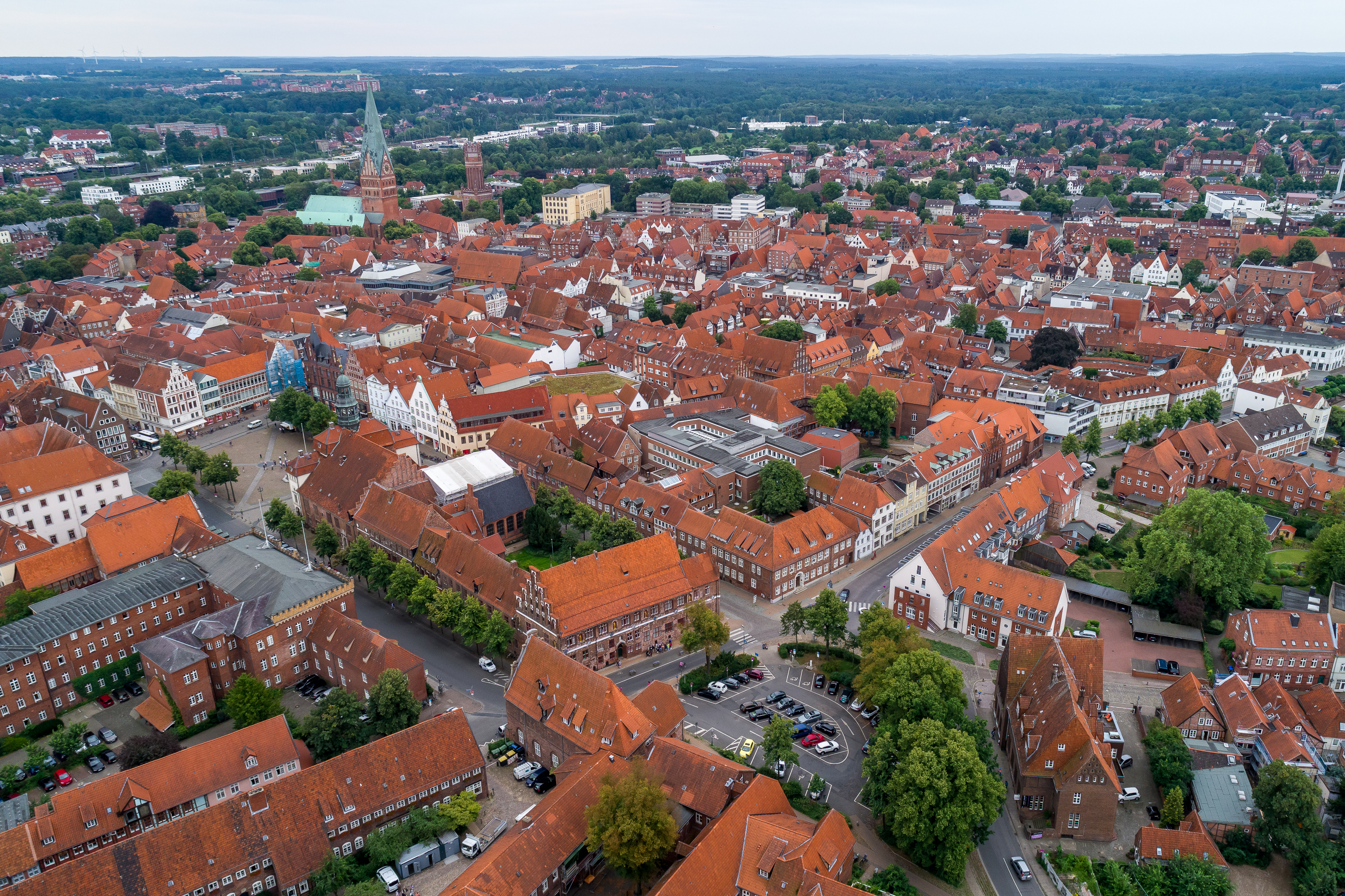
Aerial view of the historic city center of Lüneburg in 2019.

After the war ended, the Lüneburg airfield came under the control of the British Air Forces of Occupation; No. 652 Squadron RAF was based here from 1 December 1947 to 1 May 1949. Upgrading work took place in connection with the Berlin Airlift in the second half of 1949. No. 46 Group RAF disbanded here in October 1949. No. 54 Squadron RAF Regiment, a ground defence squadron, was located at Lüneburg in the later half of 1951, but was later moved to RAF Gatow in early 1952.

In the Tiergarten cemetery, a burial site has been set up for the prisoners who died in the Allied bombing raid on 7 April 1945, as well as for those who were killed in the massacre a few days later on 11 April. A memorial stone was also erected in 1954.

== Destruction ==
Compared to many other German cities during World War II, Lüneburg suffered remarkably little damage of Allied bombing campaigns during World War II. In total, 270 homes or 2.6% of the city was destroyed or damaged beyond repair. A total amount of 11,200 cubic metres (400,000 cu ft) of rubble was removed after the war had ended. 608 people also died during the attacks, be it in the city itself or during the air raid which killed Allied prisoners in April 1945.

== See also ==
- Strategic bombing during World War II
- Bombing of Hamburg in World War II
- Bombing of Lübeck in World War II
