= Lüneburg Prelates' War =

The Lüneburg Prelates' War (German: Lüneburger Prälatenkrieg) was not a war in the true sense, but a relatively bloodless, albeit vitriolic, dispute between the council of the North German town of Lüneburg and the clergy, the owners of the salt industry.

== Causes and background ==
The causes of the war go back as far as the year 1371. The town had successfully held its ground against Duke Magnus despite heavy losses. In all its debts amounted to 100,000 marks at the time, which the citizens did not want to discharge by themselves.

The officiating Wittenberg nobility decreed that, to reduce the debt, every resource available to the town (including the saltworks) had to be used. That affected the master salters (Sülfmeister) who leased the saltworks. They did not want to pay so much, however, and demanded as council members that the prelates of the surrounding villages, who owned the business, should be more heavily taxed.

The prelates refused to comply, arguing that the Lüneburg townsfolk were abusing their power and making excessive demands of the saltworks. The prelates succeeding in having the town excommunicated; this was rescinded again in 1374. The prelates then agreed to increase their financial contribution on the condition that their property was protected. This concession was repeatedly confirmed (until the last occasion in 1388), because Lüneburg's debts continued to grow as a consequence of the Lüneburg War of Succession.

== Intensification of the conflict ==
Over the next 40 years the situation in Lüneburg eased despite increased political instability outside the town gates. That changed however on the death of Boldewin von Wenden in 1441, who had acted continuously as a mediator between the council and the prelates. The prelates now paid 25% of their income to the town; nevertheless its debts rose to 550,000 marks in 1450. That was due, on the one hand, to the construction of a second town wall, and, on the other, to unplanned levies required by the nobility.

In 1445 the dispute intensified sharply when the council demanded no less than half the salt profits from the prelates. In point of fact, the monasteries were prepared to pay this after a while, but the provost of Lüne, Diderik Schaper, gave the prelates to believe that, at the last moment, the council would make further excessive demands. Lüneburg lost its credibility as a result of the dispute.

In 1451 the pope sent a representative who decided that the prelates should pay. But shortly thereafter this instruction was revoked again. When Schaper was removed from office by the council and not reinstated as demanded by the clergy when the ultimatum expired, the council was excommunicated. That initially had no effect because clergymen who refused to hold services for town council members were summoned to the town hall where they were advised to leave.

In October 1454 the excommunication order was finally reinforced and extended. The citizens were given 30 days to drop their demands or the ban would be extended again. A visit to the pope by the council met with no success. The mood of the citizens changed at the news and despite a town hall meeting the citizens put a council together of 60 people and demanded the keys to the town gates and wall towers. The old council agreed in order to stave off a revolt.

== The new council and the 60s ==
After further discussions the personal freedom of the old council was finally guaranteed, if they stood down from office voluntarily. This happened straight away. The prelates made 2 demands of the new council elected from the 60: firstly, that 285,000 marks should be paid back to them from the private estates of the old council and, secondly, that all tax income should be used to pay off the debts. This generated anger and suffering especially because many did not accept that the town taxes had arisen in recent years, but were the result of costs going back much further and which had been inherited by the old town council. Regardless, the old council members were ousted from the council on 12 December 1454 and placed under house arrest. Johan Springintgut requested at time to consider and was on the personal order of Schaper (now the town legal advisor) was banished to the dungeons where he died shortly thereafter on 15 July 1455.

== Intervention of the emperor and resolution of the conflict ==
In 1456 Diderich Springintgut, brother of Johan, and his friend Nikolas Stoketo appeared in person to the emperor and requested compensation for the death and the intervention of the emperor in the escalating conflict. This request had unexpected success. The emperor ordered the immediate reinstatement of the old council and disbandment of the new one. In Lüneburg, Schaper however tore the emperor's edict from the church door, an act which, however, did not prevent the citizens from knowing of the instruction. Schaper's deed disgusted many Lüneburg folk so greatly, that on 10 November that year there was a spontaneous, albeit bloodless, revolt on the market place. The new council conceded that the old council could be released from arrest and reinstated in their former office. Just under 2 weeks later it was officially recognised by Duke Bernard.

In 1458 two former guards of Springintgut were placed on trial, Schaper lost his office and recognition and had to leave the town. After further confusion and repeated declarations, extensions and rescinding of excommunication orders and charges of imperial outlawry the conflict with the prelates subsided, when in 1464 in Reinfeld a compromise in the shape of a treaty was agreed. Shortly afterwards the excommunication and outlawry orders were finally lifted.

== Consequences ==
The Reinfeld Treaty enabled the town of Lüneburg, to settle the bulk of its debts, the peace agreement with the emperor and the pope paved the way for new opportunities for trade and the Hanseatic League had proved that it could protect towns from the predations of the princes.

== See also ==
- Lüneburg
- Lüneburg Saltworks

== Sources ==
- Georg Friedrich Francke: "Der Lüneburgsche sogen. Prälatenkrieg." In Fünfter und sechster Jahresbericht des Museumsvereins für das Fürstentum Lüneburg 1882-1883. Lüneburg, 1884, pp. 1–48.
- Bernd-Ulrich Hergemöller. "Pfaffenkriege" im spätmittelalterlichen Hanseraum. Quellen und Studien zu Braunschweig, Osnabrück, Lüneburg und Rostock. 2 volumes, series Städteforschung C. Cologne, Vienna, 1988.
- Elmar Peter: Lüneburg - Geschichte einer 1000jährigen Stadt 956-1956. Lüneburg, 1999, ISBN 3-922616-15-1.
- Wilhelm Reinecke: Geschichte der Stadt Lüneburg. 2 volumes, Lüneburg, ^{2}1977 (1933).
- Robert Gramsch: "Städtische Gesellschaft und Kirche im sogenannten 'Lüneburger Prälatenkrieg' (1446–62)". In: S. Schmitt / S. Klapp (eds.): Städtische Gesellschaft und Kirche im Spätmittelalter. Stuttgart, 2008, pp. 93–122, ISBN 978-3-515-08573-1.
