= Häcklingen =

- Stadtteil of Lüneburg
- Interactive map of Häcklingen
- Location within Germany Location within Lower Saxony
- Coordinates: 53°12′38″N 10°23′31″E
- Country: Germany
- State: Lower Saxony
- District: Lüneburg
- Town: Lüneburg

Population (2008-12-31)
  - Total: 2,478
- Time zone: UTC+01:00 (CET)
  - Summer (DST): UTC+02:00 (CEST)
- Postal codes: 21335
- Dialling codes: 04131

Häcklingen is a village in the municipality of Lüneburg, about 6 km from the town centre. Formerly an independent municipality, it is part of the town Lüneburg since 1974. It has an area of 4.997 hectares (12.35 acres) and is bordered to the west by Rettmer. To the north it is separated from the district of Bockelsberg by a small wood, to the east it is bordered by Uelzener Straße (the old B 4 highway). The next nearest village to the south is Melbeck.

Chair of the council is Dr. Uwe Plath (CDU); he followed Susanne Pulsfort (CDU) who had been in the post for many years.

== History ==
Burial mounds and artefacts from the Federmesser culture indicate that the area has been settled since the New Stone Age.

In 1562 the convent of St. Michael's monastery built a pond in Häcklingen.

At least since 1696 there has been cooperation between Häcklingen and the neighbouring village of Rettmer. In that year there were reports of a teacher in Rettmer who also taught children from Häcklingen.

In 1792 the school was built, children from Rettmer attending from the outset.

In 1885 Häcklingen was incorporated in the newly created district of Lüneburg. Prior to that it had been subordinated to the district office of Lüne (Amt Lüne).

On 8 May 1902 the Lüneburg-Rettmer voluntary fire service (Freiwillige Feuerwehr) was founded. This was a result of new legal requirements, according to which every village had to have its own fire service. In 1934 it was divided. On 11 September the independent fire service, Freiwillige Feuerwehr Häcklingen, was formed.

On 18 August 1903 the village formed its own football club, the FC Favourite Lüneburg, which merged on 10 December 1905 with the FC Hansa Lüneburg to become SV Eintracht Lüneburg.

In 1942 there were widespread forest fires in the region due to air raids.

On 30 April 1945 the headquarters of the 2nd Britisch Army under Field Marshal Sir Bernard Montgomery was set up in Häcklingen. Shortly afterwards the surrender of the German forces in North Germany was accepted on the hill of Timeloberg.

In 1971 the Häcklingen Tennis Club was founded.

In 1974 the village was incorporated into the town of Lüneburg as part of the regional and administrative reforms in Lower Saxony.

In 2002 a daycare centre was built.

In 2003 the primary school was expanded in order to handle the growing number of children of school age in its catchment area. From then on it was three-tiered.

In 2006 the primary school was given a new gymnasium and solar panels on the roof of the school building and gym. In addition a new community centre was built for Häcklingen and Rettmer: the Bonhoeffer-Haus.

In 2007 the Lüneburg Montessori Primary School moved to Häcklingen, where it is accommodated in containers formerly used by the psychiatric clinic.

== Growth in population ==
| Year | Population |
|---|---|
| 1900 | 151 |
| 1925 | 191 |
| 1933 | 206 |
| 1939 | 207 |
| 31 December 1992 | 1,271 |
| 31 December 1993 | 1,242 |
| 31 December 1994 | 1,231 |
| 31 December 1995 | 1,220 |
| 31 December 1996 | 1,339 |
| 31 December 1997 | 1,719 |

| Year | Population |
|---|---|
| 31 December 1998 | 1,940 |
| 31 December 1999 | 2,177 |
| 31 December 2000 | 2,326 |
| 31 December 2001 | 2,399 |
| 31 December 2002 | 2,476 |
| 31 December 2003 | 2,455 |
| 31 December 2004 | 2,432 |
| 31 December 2005 | 2,469 |
| 31 December 2006 | 2,498 |
| 31 December 2007 | 2,495 |

| Year | Population |
|---|---|
| 31 December 2008 | 2,478 |

== Sonstiges ==
The village has a baker's, a chemist's, a supermarket a small Sparkasse bank branch, an Italian restaurant, a biomarket and a branch of a bookshop chain.

The ladies tennis team plays in the association league, the men's team won the championship at district level in 2006.

In 1994 the southern fire station Wache Süd was built in Rettmar, to house the three southern fire services of Häcklingen, Rettmer and Oedeme under one roof.

Since 2000 the Häcklingen fire service has deployed to incidents from Wache Süd. In 2005/2006 the old Häcklingen fire station was converted by volunteers into a youth fire station.
