= Hallors and Saline Museum =

Coordinates: 51°28′55.8″N 11°57′34.6″E

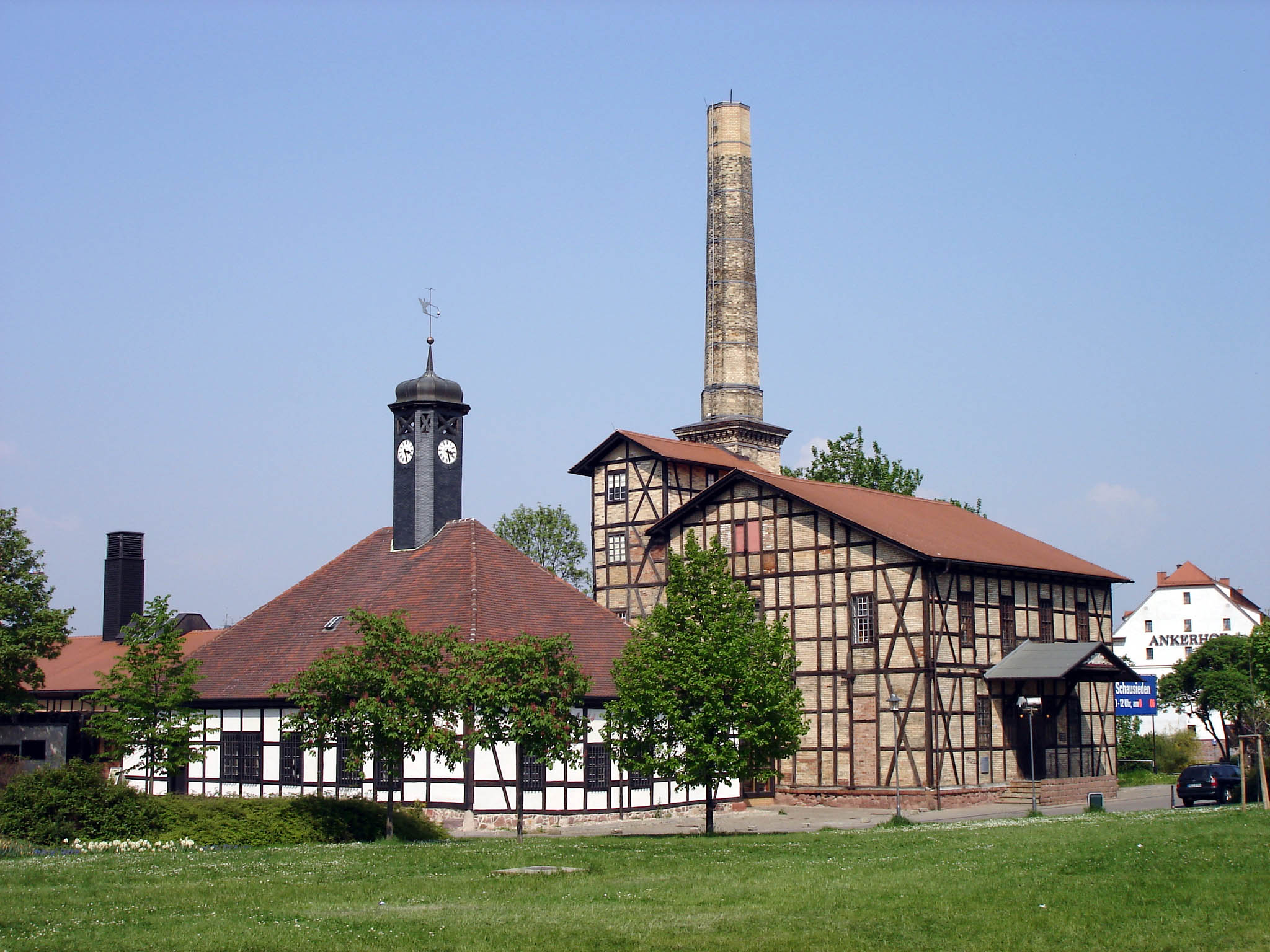
(German: Halloren ~ Salzwirker; meaning: men who “knitter” salt). (Note: This text refers to the German Wikipedia article on this subject. See: w:de:Halloren- und Salinemuseum)

Hallors and Saline Museum, Halle, Saxony-Anhalt

The Technical Hallors and Saline Museum was founded in the buildings of the former Royal Prussian Saline, Halle upon Saale in 1967. Hallors had been members of a brotherhood of salt producers.

== Geological conditions ==
The salt deposits and the local industry are based on geological conditions. Four fracture springs with brine reach the surface at the Market Square Discontinuity in Halle. The salt deposits are situated in the Lopingian (Zechstein) area of the underground.

== History of the saline area ==
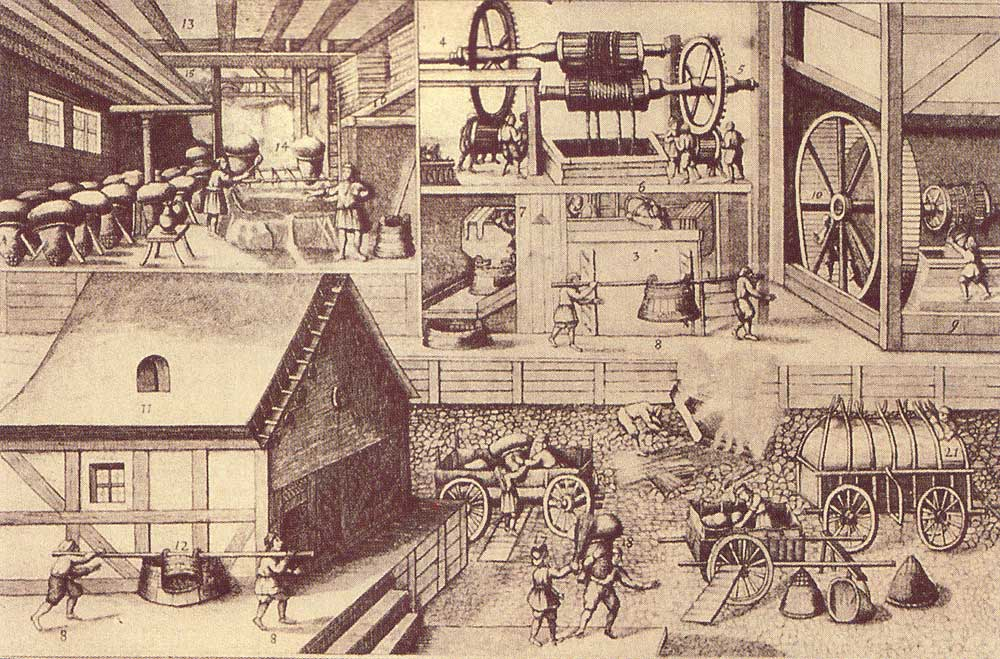
Salt in the saline pool, engraving around 1670

The rich history of salt production in Halle (Saale) goes back to the Bronze Age. As it can be traced back today: it based essentially on the use of four wells, near today's Hallmarkt (meaning: salt market square): the Meteritz Well (created 803), and the Gutjahr Well, the Hacke Well and the German Born. Of these, only the Gutjahr Well under a house in Olearius St. is still present but since the 1950s covered and currently not accessible. The boiling of the brine and refining to salt took place in nearby simple cots. This Saline was called “Lessee Saline (German: Pfännerschaftliche Saline) in the Halle Plain” because Hallmarkt is situated lower than the Market Square. Salt production in the Lessee Saline came to its end in 1869.

The Royal Prussian Saline was founded by the Prussian King Frederic William I in on an island in the Saale river in 1721. It competed with the Lessee Saline. Initially the brine was fed through pipeline from the wells around the Hallmarkt. A newly created brine well had been used on the southern part of the Holzmarkt (lumber market square) from 1926. In 1868 this Saline was taken over by the Brotherhood of Lessees (Pfännerschaft). It was decommissioned in 1964.

== Hallors and Saline Museum ==
The purpose of the museum is to demonstrate the important role that salt production had on the economic development of the city. The principal magnet is the monthly exhibition panning in the Panning House, where technology and procedures of salt production are presented. This includes the extraction of the sole, to the packing of simmered salt which dates back to the 19th century. The Exhibitive Saline has an annual production of about 70 tons of salt, which is sold locally to visitors and bakers in Halle.

In addition, visitors are shown the silver treasure of the Hallors consisting of artistically valuable cups and trophies. The oldest date back to the year 1671. Cups and trophies were gifts of local men and citizens to recognize the merits of the brotherhood of the Hallors. In addition, the visitor gets a glimpse into the traditions of this brotherhood, their historic privileges and duties. Salt plants (halophytes) – typical plants growing on salty soils – are found in the garden of the museum.

Starting on August 1, 2010, The Museum of Saline has been maintained and promoted by a non-profit association.

== Buildings and the Museum of Saline ==
The buildings of Saline are now the oldest witnesses of the industrial style architecture in Halle upon Saale. The earliest buildings were erected from 1719 to 1721. The oldest remaining part of the Saline, now designated as a Clock House, is the former Salt Store, a timber-frame building from the early 18th century with a high ridge turret. Next to it is another Salt Store, a timber-frame building from the 19th century, followed by a Simmer House from 1789 attached to the back-side. The latter is one of the oldest Simmer Houses in Germany.

Further buildings belong to Saline, including an administration building from 1884 (rebuilt 1910), another Simmer House from 1874 and a Salt Store dated 1845.

== Coal railway to Saline ==
The Pfännerschaftliche coal railway (Pfännerschaftliche Kohlebahn), a narrow gauge railway (900 mm), once delivered the brown coal fuel required for the boiling of the brine from the Alt-Zscherben mine to Saline. The open-cast mine is now flooded and is called Friedhofsteich (cemetery pond).

== See also ==
- Lüneburg Saltworks
- Saltworks
- Sülze Saltworks
