= Lüneburg Saltworks =

Salt mine in Lüneburg, Germany

The Lüneburg Saltworks (German: Lüneburger Saline) was a salt mine in the German town of Lüneburg that extracted salt.

According to legend, a hunter killed a wild boar whose coat was snow-white from crystallised salt. The sow must have wallowed in a salt spring and so the first source of salt was discovered in Lüneburg about 800 years ago.

== Operation ==
From the 12th century salt mining was the dominant feature of life in the town of Lüneburg. At that time, table salt was almost as valuable as gold and was measured in chors (1 chor = 554.32 kg), one chor being worth about 300 Reichsmarks. The salt mine was located between Sülzwiese and the hill of the Kalkberg. Its main entrance was on Lambertiplatz and the whole site was surrounded by thick walls and high towers.

To assist in the transportation of salt, a canal and a crane were built on the Stint, a former smelt market by the harbour. The square known as Am Sande was uncobbled in medieval times and covered in sand, hence the name. It acted as a trading centre for the merchants and their wares, including salt.

== Organisation ==
The centre of the saltworks was a salt spring (Sod) surrounded by 54 boiling huts (Siedehütten). The four boiling pans (Siedepfannen) in each hut, which were named after their first occupants, were supplied by channels and canals with brine. The brine was carried in buckets from the boiling chamber (Siedekammer) to ground level and then divided up between the 216 boiling pans. On the boiling site there was a salt stall (Salzbude) for selling small quantities of salt, as well as a tax office (Zollbude) responsible for handling tax and duty.

== Property situation ==
The owners of the pans were called Sülzbegüterte ("salt gentry") and did not necessarily live in Lüneburg. They did not boil the brine themselves, but leased them to those with boiling rights living in Lüneburg. If such a Siedeberechtigter leased at least four pans, he became known as a Sülfmeister ("master salter") and had a claim to his own boiling hut. That said, a master salter was not allowed more than two huts i.e. eight pans. The lease amounted to one half of the revenue from the boiling pan.

At the beginning of the 13th century the salt gentry were a mixture of clergymen and the nobility. Between 1250 and 1320, an increasing number of ordinary merchants became salt pan owners and there was a corresponding decrease in aristocratic salt gentry. In 1370 the number of merchants who owned pans was almost the same as the number of clergymen; a century later three-quarters of the pans belonged to the clergy, who were known as prelates.

In addition to the salt gentry and salters, there were also the Barmeister and the Sodmeister. The Barmeister was the foreman of the pan smithy (Bare) where the pans were cast. He was chosen by the master salters and the town council. The Sodmeister looked after the distribution of brine and was chosen by the salt owners and the town council.

== Salt tax ==
The salt tax (Sülzhilfe) was a levy from the prelates to the council to defray the duty payable to the town. This meant that the clerical salt owners had to give up part of their brine income, initially a tenth part of every pfennig. The amount increased over the course of time to a quarter of a pfennig. Although by 1442 they paid one quarter of their income this still did not cover the duty levied by the town.

For that reason from 1445, double tax was paid i.e. half of each pfennig had to be paid to the town council. This generated much distrust of the council especially from the Butenländischen and the Lüneburg provost, Scharper, and they refused to pay the sum demanded. This conflict flared up into the Lüneburg Prelates War.

== See also ==
- Saltworks
- Hallors and Saline Museum
- Lüneburg Kalkberg
- Sülze Saltworks

== Sources ==
- Karl Bachmann, Die Rentner der Lüneburger Saline (1200–1370), Hildesheim 1983
- Georg Friedrich Francke, Der Lüneburgsche sogenannte Prälatenkrieg, in: Fünfter und sechster Jahresbericht des Museumsvereins für das Fürstentum Lüneburg 1882-1883. Lüneburg 1884, S. 1–3
- Axel Janowitz, Die Lüneburger Saline im 18. und 19. Jahrhundert, 2003, ISBN 978-3-89534-435-0
- Elmar Peter, Geschichte einer 1000jährigen Stadt 956-1956, Lüneburg 1999, S. 191f.
- Wilhelm Reinecke, Geschichte der Stadt Lüneburg, 2 Bde. Lüneburg ^{2}1977 (1933)
- Wilhelm Friedrich Volger, Die Lüneburger Sülze, 1956
