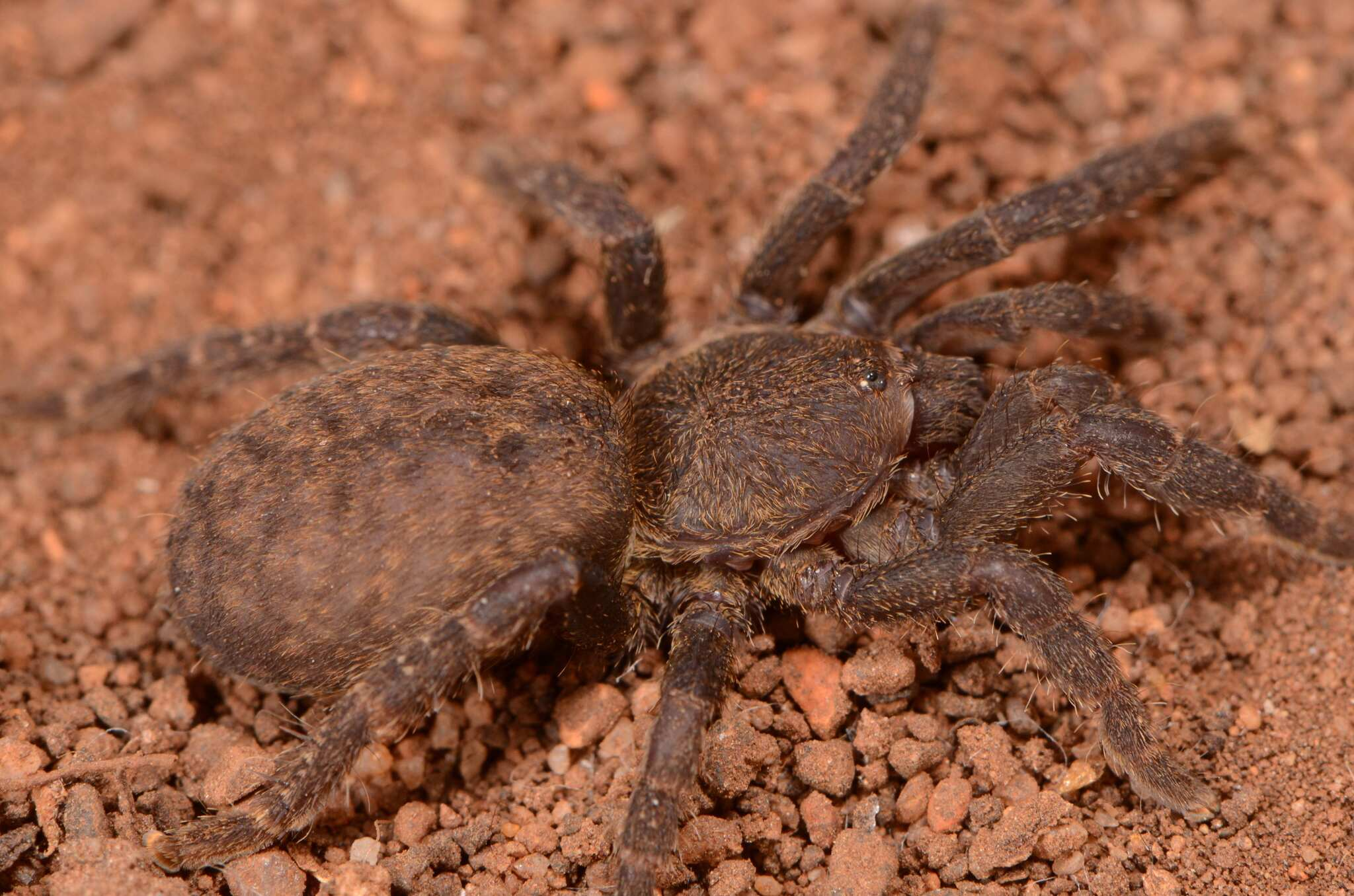
- female
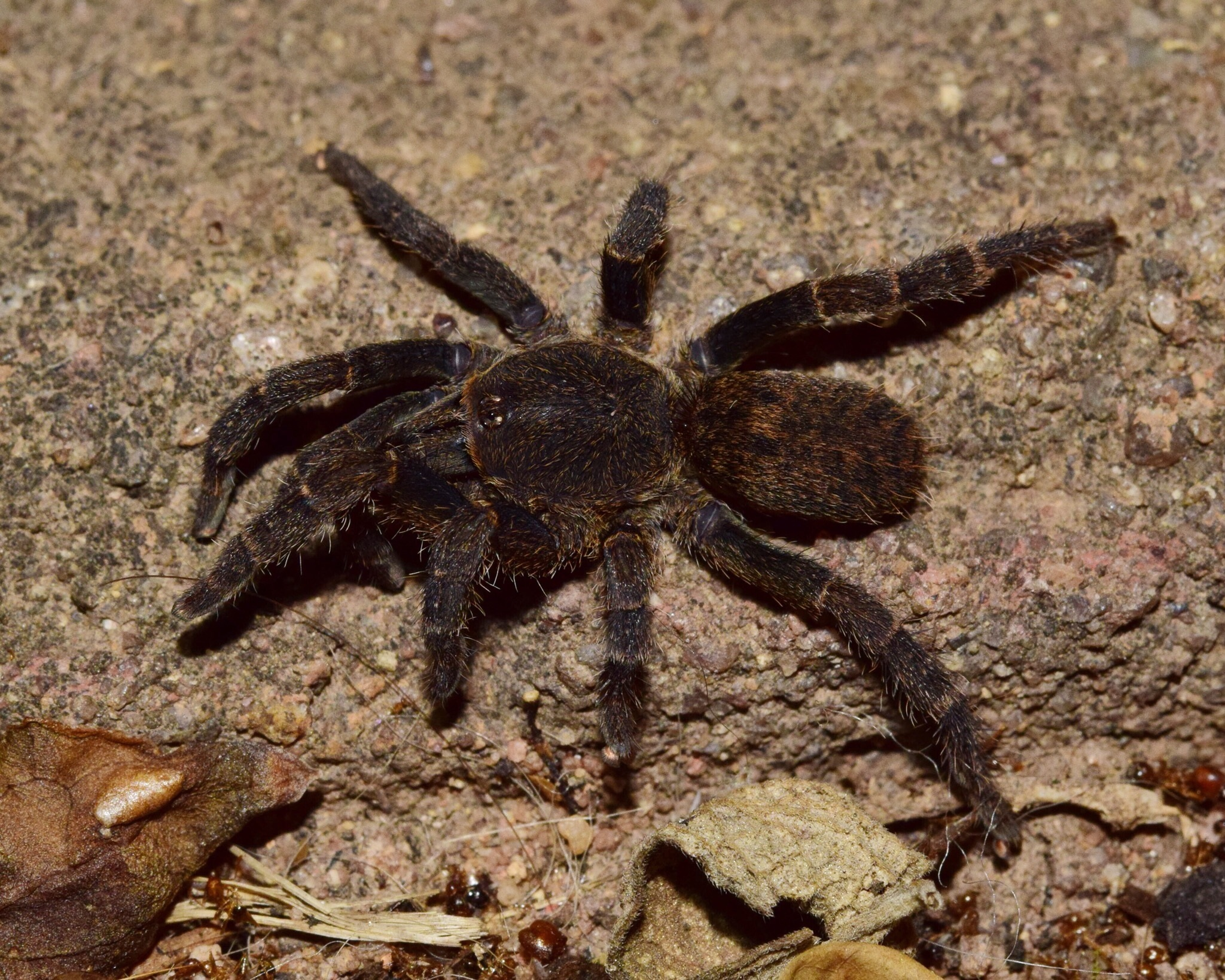

Scientific classification
- Kingdom: Animalia
- Phylum: Arthropoda
- Subphylum: Chelicerata
- Class: Arachnida
- Order: Araneae
- Infraorder: Mygalomorphae
- Family: Theraphosidae
- Genus: Brachionopus
- Species: B. robustus

Binomial name
- Brachionopus robustus Pocock, 1897

= Brachionopus robustus =

Robust lesser baboon spider

Species of spider

Brachionopus robustus, also known by its common name robust lesser baboon spider, is a species from the genus Brachionopus. The species was originally described by Reginald Innes Pocock in 1897. It is endemic to South Africa.
