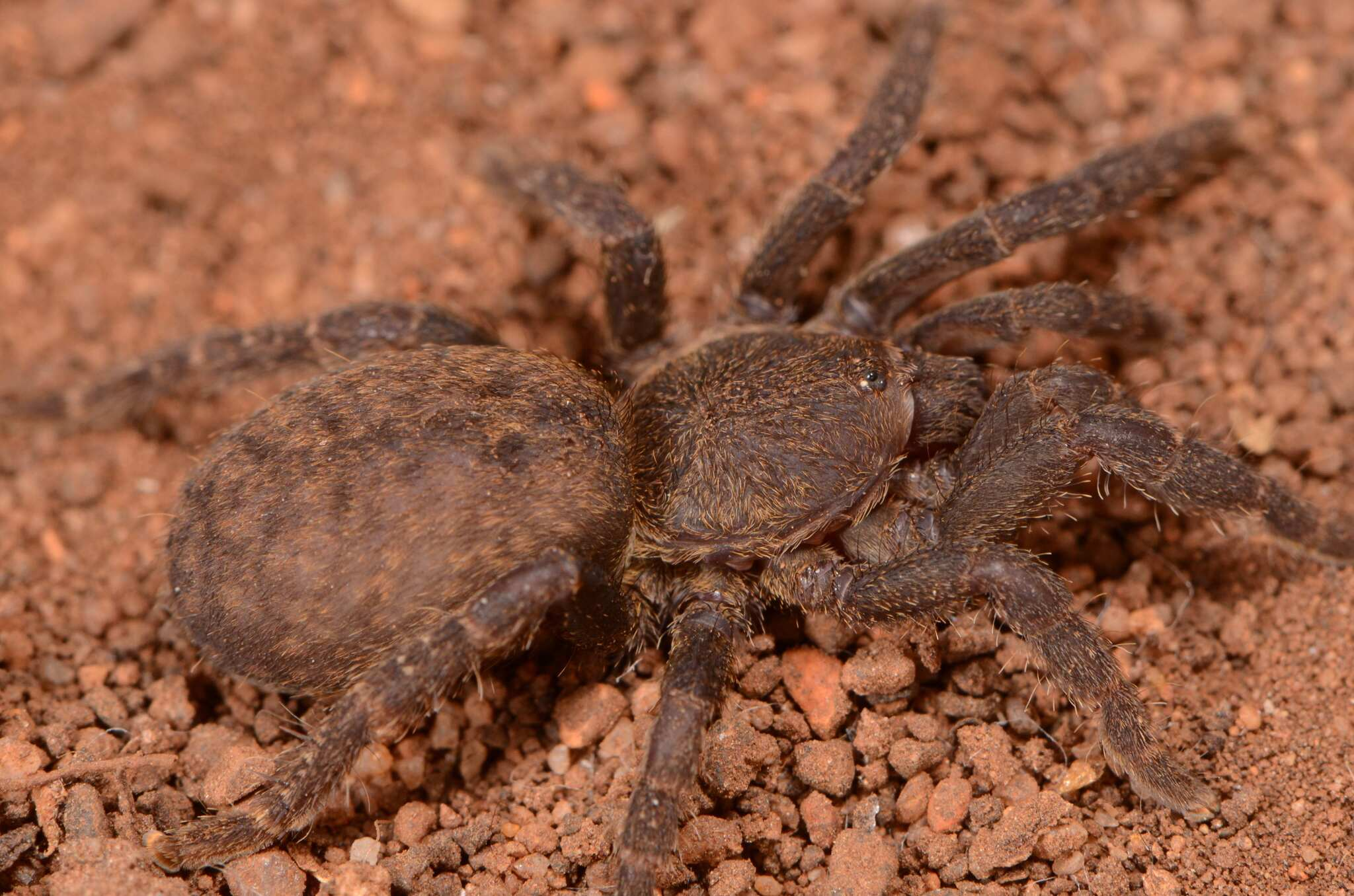
- female B. robustus
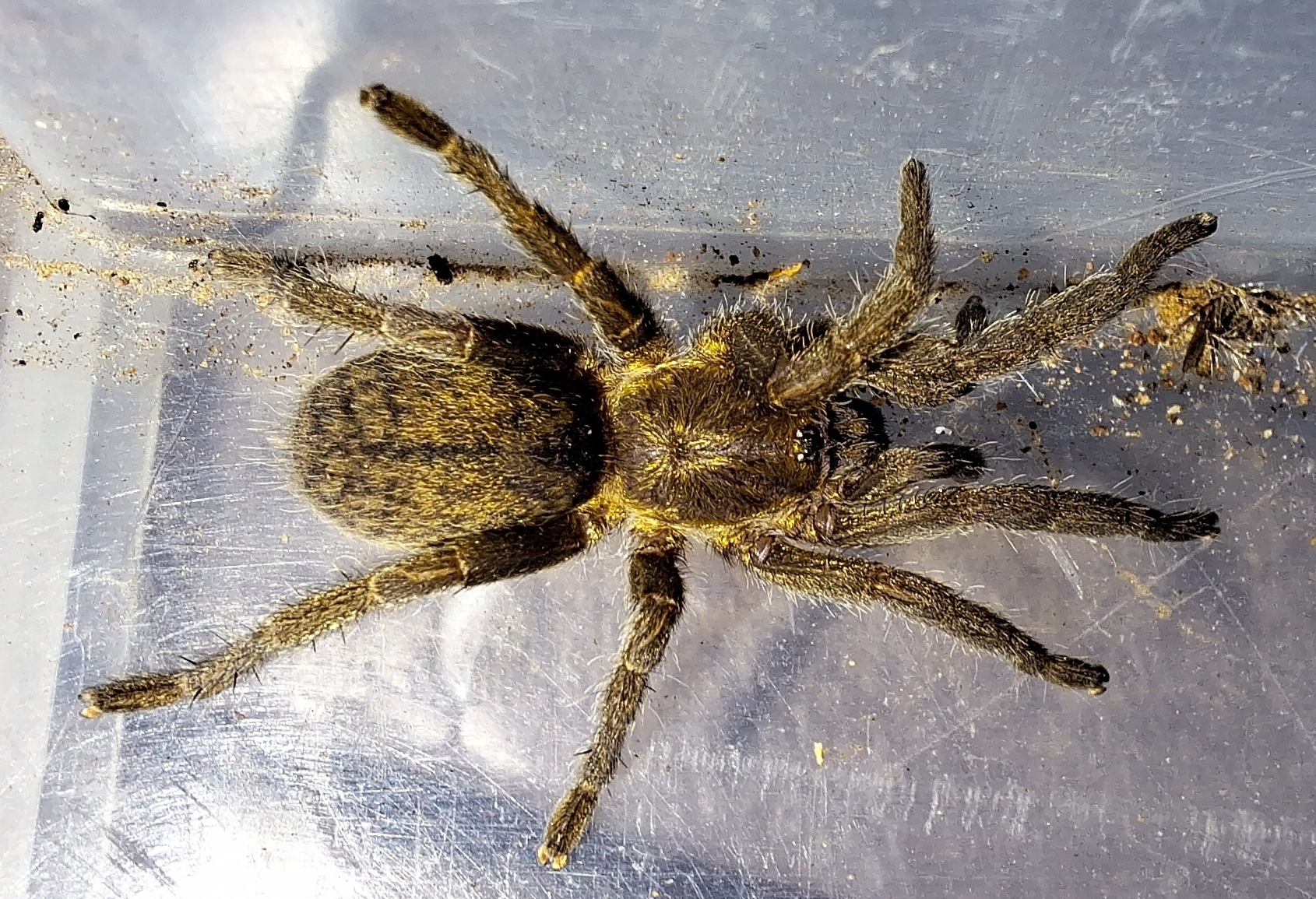
- B. pretoriae

Scientific classification
- Kingdom: Animalia
- Phylum: Arthropoda
- Subphylum: Chelicerata
- Class: Arachnida
- Order: Araneae
- Infraorder: Mygalomorphae
- Family: Theraphosidae
- Genus: Brachionopus; Pocock, 1897

Type species
- B. robustus Pocock, 1897

Species
- 4, see text

= Brachionopus =

Genus of spiders

Brachionopus is a genus of South African tarantulas that was first described by Reginald Innes Pocock in 1897. It was transferred to the Theraphosidae from the Barychelidae in 1985.

All described species are endemic to South Africa.

== Species ==
As of October 2025, this genus includes four species:

- Brachionopus annulatus Purcell, 1903
- Brachionopus pretoriae Purcell, 1904
- Brachionopus robustus Pocock, 1897 (type species)
- Brachionopus tristis Purcell, 1903
