= Eosentomon indicum =

Scientific classification
- Domain: Eukaryota
- Kingdom: Animalia
- Phylum: Arthropoda
- Order: Protura
- Family: Eosentomidae
- Genus: Eosentomon
- Species: E. indicum

Binomial name
- Eosentomon indicum (Schepotieff, 1909)

Species of insect-like animal

Eosentomon indicum is a species of proturan in the family Eosentomidae. It is found in Southern Asia.
