= Eosentomon betschi =

Scientific classification
- Domain: Eukaryota
- Kingdom: Animalia
- Phylum: Arthropoda
- Class: Entognatha
- Order: Protura
- Family: Eosentomidae
- Genus: Eosentomon
- Species: E. betschi

Binomial name
- Eosentomon betschi Nosek, 1978

Species of insect-like animal

Eosentomon betschi is a species of Protura in the family Eosentomidae. It is found in Africa.
