= Eosentomon wheeleri =

Scientific classification
- Domain: Eukaryota
- Kingdom: Animalia
- Phylum: Arthropoda
- Order: Protura
- Family: Eosentomidae
- Genus: Eosentomon
- Species: E. wheeleri

Binomial name
- Eosentomon wheeleri Silvestri, 1909

Species of insect-like animal

Eosentomon wheeleri is a species of proturan in the family Eosentomidae. It is found in North America.
