= Eosentomon saharense =

Scientific classification
- Kingdom: Animalia
- Phylum: Arthropoda
- Class: Entognatha
- Order: Protura
- Family: Eosentomidae
- Genus: Eosentomon
- Species: E. saharense

Binomial name
- Eosentomon saharense Condé, 1951

Species of insect-like animal

Eosentomon saharense is a species of proturan in the family Eosentomidae. It is found in Africa.
