= Eosentomon xenomystax =

Scientific classification
- Kingdom: Animalia
- Phylum: Arthropoda
- Class: Entognatha
- Order: Protura
- Family: Eosentomidae
- Genus: Eosentomon
- Species: E. xenomystax

Binomial name
- Eosentomon xenomystax Bernard, 1990

Species of insect-like animal

Eosentomon xenomystax is a species of proturan in the family Eosentomidae. It is found in North America.
