= Eosentomon bolivari =

Scientific classification
- Domain: Eukaryota
- Kingdom: Animalia
- Phylum: Arthropoda
- Order: Protura
- Family: Eosentomidae
- Genus: Eosentomon
- Species: E. bolivari

Binomial name
- Eosentomon bolivari Bonet, 1949

Species of insect-like animal

Eosentomon bolivari is a species of proturan in the family Eosentomidae. It is found in Central America.
