= Eosentomon maya =

Scientific classification
- Domain: Eukaryota
- Kingdom: Animalia
- Phylum: Arthropoda
- Order: Protura
- Family: Eosentomidae
- Genus: Eosentomon
- Species: E. maya

Binomial name
- Eosentomon maya Bonet, 1950

Species of insect-like animal

Eosentomon maya is a species of proturan in the family Eosentomidae. It is found in Central America.
