= Eosentomon brevisetosum =

Scientific classification
- Domain: Eukaryota
- Kingdom: Animalia
- Phylum: Arthropoda
- Order: Protura
- Family: Eosentomidae
- Genus: Eosentomon
- Species: E. brevisetosum

Binomial name
- Eosentomon brevisetosum Tuxen, 1977

Species of insect-like animal

Eosentomon brevisetosum is a species of proturan in the family Eosentomidae. It is found in Africa.
