= Eosentomon nayari =

Scientific classification
- Domain: Eukaryota
- Kingdom: Animalia
- Phylum: Arthropoda
- Order: Protura
- Family: Eosentomidae
- Genus: Eosentomon
- Species: E. nayari

Binomial name
- Eosentomon nayari Prabhoo, 1977

Species of insect-like animal

Eosentomon nayari is a species of proturan in the family Eosentomidae. It is found in Southern Asia.
