= Paranisentomon triglobulum =

Scientific classification
- Domain: Eukaryota
- Kingdom: Animalia
- Phylum: Arthropoda
- Order: Protura
- Family: Eosentomidae
- Genus: Paranisentomon
- Species: P. triglobulum

Binomial name
- Paranisentomon triglobulum (Yin & Zhang, 1982)

Species of insect-like animal

Paranisentomon triglobulum is a species of proturan in the family Eosentomidae. It is found in Southern Asia.
