= Eosentomon medleri =

Scientific classification
- Domain: Eukaryota
- Kingdom: Animalia
- Phylum: Arthropoda
- Order: Protura
- Family: Eosentomidae
- Genus: Eosentomon
- Species: E. medleri

Binomial name
- Eosentomon medleri Tuxen, 1977

Species of insect-like animal

Eosentomon medleri is a species of proturan in the family Eosentomidae. It is found in Africa.
