= Eosentomon heatherproctorae =

Scientific classification
- Domain: Eukaryota
- Kingdom: Animalia
- Phylum: Arthropoda
- Order: Protura
- Family: Eosentomidae
- Genus: Eosentomon
- Species: E. heatherproctorae

Binomial name
- Eosentomon heatherproctorae Bernard & Guzowski, 2003

Species of insect-like animal

Eosentomon heatherproctorae is a species of proturan in the family Eosentomidae. It is found in North America.
