= Neanisentomon guicum =

Scientific classification
- Domain: Eukaryota
- Kingdom: Animalia
- Phylum: Arthropoda
- Order: Protura
- Family: Eosentomidae
- Genus: Neanisentomon
- Species: N. guicum

Binomial name
- Neanisentomon guicum Zhang & Yin, 1984

Species of insect-like animal

Neanisentomon guicum is a species of proturan in the family Eosentomidae. It is found in Southern Asia.
