= Styletoentomon styletum =

Scientific classification
- Domain: Eukaryota
- Kingdom: Animalia
- Phylum: Arthropoda
- Order: Protura
- Family: Eosentomidae
- Genus: Styletoentomon
- Species: S. styletum

Binomial name
- Styletoentomon styletum Copeland, 1978

Species of insect-like animal

Styletoentomon styletum is a species of proturan in the family Eosentomidae. It is found in North America.
