= Eosentomon konsenense =

Scientific classification
- Domain: Eukaryota
- Kingdom: Animalia
- Phylum: Arthropoda
- Order: Protura
- Family: Eosentomidae
- Genus: Eosentomon
- Species: E. konsenense

Binomial name
- Eosentomon konsenense Imadaté, 1994

Species of insect-like animal

Eosentomon konsenense is a species of proturan in the family Eosentomidae. It is found in Southern Asia.
