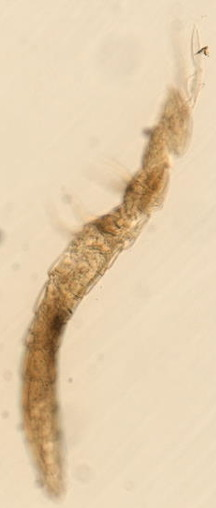

Scientific classification
- Domain: Eukaryota
- Kingdom: Animalia
- Phylum: Arthropoda
- Order: Protura
- Family: Eosentomidae
- Genus: Eosentomon
- Species: E. vermiforme

Binomial name
- Eosentomon vermiforme Ewing, 1921

= Eosentomon vermiforme =

Species of insect-like animal

Eosentomon vermiforme is a species of proturan in the family Eosentomidae. It is found in North America.
