= Eosentomon wygodzinskyi =

Scientific classification
- Domain: Eukaryota
- Kingdom: Animalia
- Phylum: Arthropoda
- Order: Protura
- Family: Eosentomidae
- Genus: Eosentomon
- Species: E. wygodzinskyi

Binomial name
- Eosentomon wygodzinskyi Bonet, 1950

Species of insect-like animal

Eosentomon wygodzinskyi is a species of proturan in the family Eosentomidae. It is found in Africa, Australia, South America, and Southern Asia.
