= Eosentomon tennesseense =

Scientific classification
- Kingdom: Animalia
- Phylum: Arthropoda
- Class: Entognatha
- Order: Protura
- Family: Eosentomidae
- Genus: Eosentomon
- Species: E. tennesseense

Binomial name
- Eosentomon tennesseense Copeland, 1964

Species of insect-like animal

Eosentomon tennesseense is a species of proturan in the family Eosentomidae. It is found in North America.
