= Neanisentomon yuenicum =

Scientific classification
- Domain: Eukaryota
- Kingdom: Animalia
- Phylum: Arthropoda
- Order: Protura
- Family: Eosentomidae
- Genus: Neanisentomon
- Species: N. yuenicum

Binomial name
- Neanisentomon yuenicum Zhang & Yin, 1984

Species of insect-like animal

Neanisentomon yuenicum is a species of proturan in the family Eosentomidae.

It can be found in Southern Asia.
