= Eosentomon strioculi =

Scientific classification
- Kingdom: Animalia
- Phylum: Arthropoda
- Class: Entognatha
- Order: Protura
- Family: Eosentomidae
- Genus: Eosentomon
- Species: E. strioculi

Binomial name
- Eosentomon strioculi Yin, 1982

Species of insect-like animal

Eosentomon strioculi is a species of proturan in the family Eosentomidae. It is found in Southern Asia.
