= Eosentomon zhanjiangense =

Scientific classification
- Domain: Eukaryota
- Kingdom: Animalia
- Phylum: Arthropoda
- Class: Entognatha
- Order: Protura
- Family: Eosentomidae
- Genus: Eosentomon
- Species: E. zhanjiangense

Binomial name
- Eosentomon zhanjiangense Zhang, 1983

Species of insect-like animal

Eosentomon zhanjiangense is a species of proturan in the family Eosentomidae. It can be found in Southern Asia.
