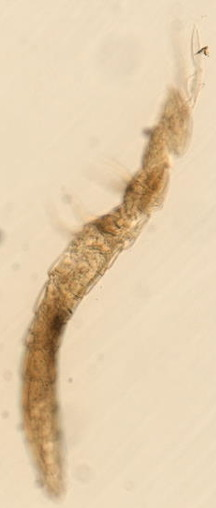
- Eosentomon vermiforme

Scientific classification
- Domain: Eukaryota
- Kingdom: Animalia
- Phylum: Arthropoda
- Order: Protura
- Family: Eosentomidae
- Genus: Eosentomon; Berlese, 1908

= Eosentomon =

Genus of insect-like animals

Eosentomon is a genus of proturans in the family Eosentomidae.

== Species ==
- Eosentomon actitum Zhang, 1983
- Eosentomon adakense Bernard, 1985
- Eosentomon adami Condé, 1961
- Eosentomon affine Tuxen, 1967
- Eosentomon afrorostratum Tuxen, 1977
- Eosentomon agaeophthalmum Yin & Zhang, 1982
- Eosentomon ailaoense Imadaté, Yin & Xie, 1995
- Eosentomon alaskaense Nosek, 1977
- Eosentomon alcirae Najt & Vidal Sarmiento, 1972
- Eosentomon angolae Tuxen, 1977
- Eosentomon ankarafantsikaense Nosek, 1978
- Eosentomon antrimense Bernard, 1975
- Eosentomon aquilinum Nosek, 1980
- Eosentomon armatum Stach, 1926
- Eosentomon asahi Imadaté, 1961
- Eosentomon asakawaense Imadaté, 1961
- Eosentomon australicum Womersley, 1939
- Eosentomon bannaense Yin, Xie & Imadaté, 1995
- Eosentomon belli Yin, 1982
- Eosentomon beltrani Bonet, 1949
- Eosentomon bernardi Nosek & Kevan, 1984
- Eosentomon betschi Nosek, 1978
- Eosentomon bilapilli Chao & Chen, 1996
- Eosentomon binchuanense Yin, Xie & Imadaté, 2000
- Eosentomon bloszyki Szeptycki, 1985
- Eosentomon boedvarssoni Nosek, 1973
- Eosentomon boguslavi Szeptycki, 1977
- Eosentomon bohemicum Rusek, 1966
- Eosentomon bolivari Bonet, 1949
- Eosentomon boneti Tuxen, 1956
- Eosentomon bornemisszai Tuxen, 1967
- Eosentomon brevicorpusculum Yin, 1965
- Eosentomon brevisensorium Chao & Chen, 1996
- Eosentomon brevisetosum Tuxen, 1977
- Eosentomon bryophilum Szeptycki, 1986
- Eosentomon burahacabanicum Yin & Dallai, 1985
- Eosentomon caatingae Tuxen, 1976
- Eosentomon caddoense Tipping & Allen, 1994
- Eosentomon canadense Nosek & Kevan, 1984
- Eosentomon canarinum Szeptycki, 2004
- Eosentomon carolae Condé, 1947
- Eosentomon carpaticum Szeptycki, 1985
- Eosentomon cetium Szeptycki & Christian, 2000
- Eosentomon ceylonicum Nosek, 1976
- Eosentomon chantek Imadaté, 1965
- Eosentomon chickasawense Outten & Allen, 1989
- Eosentomon chishiaense Yin, 1965
- Eosentomon christianseni Bonet, 1950
- Eosentomon chunchengense Yin, Xie & Imadaté, 1995
- Eosentomon chuxiongense Yin, Xie & Imadaté, 1995
- Eosentomon cocqueti Condé, 1952
- Eosentomon coiffaiti Condé, 1961
- Eosentomon columbiense Tuxen, 1976
- Eosentomon commune Yin, 1965
- Eosentomon condei da Cunha, 1950
- Eosentomon convexoculi Chao & Chen, 1996
- Eosentomon copelandi Nosek, 1980
- Eosentomon coruscoculi Chao & Chen, 1996
- Eosentomon crassus Vidal Sarmiento & Najt, 1971
- Eosentomon crypticum Bernard, 1990
- Eosentomon curupira Tuxen, 1976
- Eosentomon daii Yin, 1982
- Eosentomon daliense Imadaté, Yin & Xie, 1995
- Eosentomon dawsoni Condé, 1952
- Eosentomon delicatum Gisin, 1945
- Eosentomon denisi Condé, 1947
- Eosentomon depilatum Bonet, 1950
- Eosentomon destitutum Bonet, 1949
- Eosentomon dian Yin, Xie & Imadaté, 1995
- Eosentomon dimecempodi Yin, 1990
- Eosentomon dissimile Yin, 1979
- Eosentomon dounanense Imadaté, 1994
- Eosentomon drymoetes Yin, 1982
- Eosentomon dureyi Copeland, 1964
- Eosentomon dusun Imadaté, 1965
- Eosentomon enigmaticum Szeptycki, 1986
- Eosentomon erwini Copeland, 1978
- Eosentomon ewingi Bonet, 1950
- Eosentomon fichteliense Rusek, 1988
- Eosentomon foliaceum Rusek, 1988
- Eosentomon foroiuliense Torti & Nosek, 1984
- Eosentomon francoisi Nosek, 1978
- Eosentomon funkei Rusek, 1988
- Eosentomon gabonense Tuxen, 1979
- Eosentomon gamae Aldaba, 1986
- Eosentomon gaoligongense Xie, 2000
- Eosentomon germanicum Prell, 1912
- Eosentomon gimangi Imadaté, 1965
- Eosentomon gisini Nosek, 1967
- Eosentomon gracile Tuxen, 1986
- Eosentomon gramineum Szeptycki, 1986
- Eosentomon guadalcanalense Tuxen & Imadaté, 1975
- Eosentomon guyongense Xie & Yin, 2000
- Eosentomon hainanense Yin, 1986
- Eosentomon hargrovei Bernard, 1990
- Eosentomon heatherproctorae Bernard & Guzowski, 2002
- Eosentomon hoogstraali Nosek, 1973
- Eosentomon huatingense Yin, Xie & Imadaté, 1995
- Eosentomon huetheri Nosek, 1973
- Eosentomon hunnicutti Outten & Allen, 1989
- Eosentomon hwashanense Chou & Yang, 1964
- Eosentomon hyatti Condé, 1958
- Eosentomon iban Imadaté, 1965
- Eosentomon imadatei Tuxen, 1967
- Eosentomon imbutum Imadaté, 1965
- Eosentomon indicum (Schepotieff, 1909)
- Eosentomon insularum Tuxen, 1977
- Eosentomon intermedium Tuxen, 1979
- Eosentomon iranicum Szeptycki, 1977
- Eosentomon jabanicum Berlese, 1912
- Eosentomon jinggangense Yin, 1987
- Eosentomon jinhongense Yin, 1982
- Eosentomon jinxiuense Zhang, 1984
- Eosentomon juni Imadaté, 1994
- Eosentomon kamenickiense Rusek, 1974
- Eosentomon kimum Imadaté, 1964
- Eosentomon kloomi Imadaté, 1965
- Eosentomon konsenense Imadaté, 1994
- Eosentomon kumei Imadaté & Yosii, 1959
- Eosentomon lancanicum Yin, 1982
- Eosentomon lapilloculi Chao & Chen, 1996
- Eosentomon lijiangense Xie, Yin & Imadaté, 2000
- Eosentomon lineare Yin, 1979
- Eosentomon longisquamum Szeptycki, 1986
- Eosentomon luquanense Xie, 2000
- Eosentomon lusitanicum Aldaba, 1986
- Eosentomon luxembourgense Szeptycki, 2001
- Eosentomon luzonense Imadaté, 1990
- Eosentomon maai Chao & Chen, 1996
- Eosentomon machadoi Condé, 1949
- Eosentomon macronyx Tuxen, 1986
- Eosentomon madagascariense Nosek, 1978
- Eosentomon magnum Yin & Zhang, 1982
- Eosentomon margarops Yin & Zhang, 1982
- Eosentomon mariae Szeptycki, 1986
- Eosentomon maryae Tipping & Allen, 1995
- Eosentomon massoudi Nosek, 1978
- Eosentomon matahari Imadaté, 1965
- Eosentomon maximum Tuxen, 1986
- Eosentomon maya Bonet, 1950
- Eosentomon medleri Tuxen, 1977
- Eosentomon megaglenum Yin, 1990
- Eosentomon megastigma Xie & Yin, 2000
- Eosentomon megatibiense Tipping & Allen, 1995
- Eosentomon meizotarsi Yin, 1982
- Eosentomon melanesiense Tuxen & Imadaté, 1975
- Eosentomon mexicanum Silvestri, 1909
- Eosentomon microphthalmum Tuxen, 1978
- Eosentomon minutum Nosek, 1978
- Eosentomon mirabile Szeptycki, 1984
- Eosentomon miroglenum Yin, 1981
- Eosentomon mixtum Condé, 1945
- Eosentomon mogadishense Yin & Dallai, 1985
- Eosentomon monlaense Yin, 1982
- Eosentomon montanum Copeland, 1964
- Eosentomon murphyi Imadaté, 1965
- Eosentomon mutti Nosek, 1978
- Eosentomon nanningense Yin & Zhang, 1982
- Eosentomon nayari Prabhoo, 1977
- Eosentomon nigeriense Tuxen, 1979
- Eosentomon nivoculum Yin, 1981
- Eosentomon noonadanae Tuxen & Imadaté, 1975
- Eosentomon noseki Tuxen, 1982
- Eosentomon notiale Tuxen & Imadaté, 1975
- Eosentomon novemchaetum Yin, 1965
- Eosentomon nudilabratum Bernard, 1990
- Eosentomon nuijangense Xie, 2000
- Eosentomon nupri Nakamura, 1983
- Eosentomon occidentale Szeptycki, 1985
- Eosentomon oceaniae Tuxen & Imadaté, 1975
- Eosentomon orientale Yin, 1965
- Eosentomon osageorum Bernard, 1990
- Eosentomon pacificum Imadaté & Yosii, 1959
- Eosentomon pairathi Imadaté, 1965
- Eosentomon paktai Imadaté, 1965
- Eosentomon pallidum Ewing, 1921
- Eosentomon palustre Szeptycki & Slawska, 2000
- Eosentomon paramonis Tuxen, 1976
- Eosentomon parvum Szeptycki, 1986
- Eosentomon pasohense Imadaté, 1976
- Eosentomon pastorale Szeptycki, 2001
- Eosentomon paucrum Szeptycki, 2001
- Eosentomon pelaezi Bonet, 1949
- Eosentomon penelopae Tuxen, 1977
- Eosentomon perreti Condé, 1954
- Eosentomon pinetorum Szeptycki, 1984
- Eosentomon pinkyae Arbea-Polite, 1990
- Eosentomon pinusbanksianum Bernard, 1975
- Eosentomon polonicum Szeptycki, 1985
- Eosentomon pomari Bernard, 1975
- Eosentomon posnaniense Szeptycki, 1986
- Eosentomon pratense Rusek, 1973
- Eosentomon proximum Tuxen, 1976
- Eosentomon pruni Bernard, 1975
- Eosentomon pseudowheeleri Copeland, 1964
- Eosentomon pseudoyosemitense Copeland & White, 1978
- Eosentomon puertoricoense Nosek, 1978
- Eosentomon pusillum Ewing, 1940
- Eosentomon quadridentatum Copeland, 1964
- Eosentomon quapawense Tipping & Allen, 1994
- Eosentomon rachelae Szeptycki & Broza, 2003
- Eosentomon rafalskii Szeptycki, 1985
- Eosentomon recula Bonet, 1949
- Eosentomon rehaiense Xie & Yin, 2000
- Eosentomon renatae Bernard, 1990
- Eosentomon richardi Bernard, 1990
- Eosentomon rishir Nakamura, 2004
- Eosentomon riyuetanense Nakamura, 1997
- Eosentomon romanum Nosek, 1969
- Eosentomon ruiliense Xie, 2000
- Eosentomon rusekianum Stumpp & Szeptycki, 1989
- Eosentomon saharense Condé, 1951
- Eosentomon sakura Imadaté & Yosii, 1959
- Eosentomon savannahense Bernard, 1990
- Eosentomon sawasdi Imadaté, 1965
- Eosentomon sayani Imadaté, 1965
- Eosentomon semiarmatum Denis, 1927
- Eosentomon sexsetosum Szeptycki, 1985
- Eosentomon shanghaiense Yin, 1979
- Eosentomon shanum Yin, 1992
- Eosentomon silesiacum Szeptycki, 1985
- Eosentomon silvaticum Szeptycki, 1986
- Eosentomon simile Condé, 1948
- Eosentomon snideri Bernard, 1990
- Eosentomon sociale Bernard, 1975
- Eosentomon solarzi Szeptycki, 1993
- Eosentomon solomonense Tuxen & Imadaté, 1975
- Eosentomon spanum Yin, 1986
- Eosentomon squamigerum Condé, 1961
- Eosentomon stachi Rusek, 1966
- Eosentomon stompi Szeptycki & Weiner, 1993
- Eosentomon strioculi Yin, 1982
- Eosentomon stumppi Rusek, 1988
- Eosentomon sturmi Tuxen, 1976
- Eosentomon subglabrum Condé, 1961
- Eosentomon subnudum Tuxen, 1978
- Eosentomon sudeticum Szeptycki, 1985
- Eosentomon swani Womersley, 1932
- Eosentomon taiwanense Nakamura, 1997
- Eosentomon tamurai Nakamura, 1997
- Eosentomon tankoktongi Imadaté, 1965
- Eosentomon tapiasum Nosek, 1978
- Eosentomon temannegarai Nosek, 1976
- Eosentomon tengchongense Xie & Yin, 2000
- Eosentomon tennesseense Copeland, 1964
- Eosentomon thamnooni Imadaté, 1965
- Eosentomon thibaudi Nosek, 1978
- Eosentomon toi Imadaté, 1964
- Eosentomon tokiokai Imadaté, 1964
- Eosentomon tokui Imadaté, 1974
- Eosentomon topochi Imadaté, 1964
- Eosentomon torbongsi Imadaté, 1965
- Eosentomon transitorium Berlese, 1908
- Eosentomon trivandricum Prabhoo, 1975
- Eosentomon tropicum Yin, 1986
- Eosentomon tschergense Szeptycki, 1988
- Eosentomon turneri Bonet, 1950
- Eosentomon tuxenanum Chou & Yang, 1964
- Eosentomon udagawai Imadaté, 1961
- Eosentomon udorni Imadaté, 1965
- Eosentomon ulinense Szeptycki, 1999
- Eosentomon umbrosum Szeptycki, 2001
- Eosentomon unirecessum Yin, 1979
- Eosentomon validum Condé, 1961
- Eosentomon venezuelense Glance, 1952
- Eosentomon vermiforme Ewing, 1921
- Eosentomon vermontense Nosek & Kevan, 1984
- Eosentomon vindobonense Szeptycki & Christian, 2000
- Eosentomon vulgare Szeptycki, 1984
- Eosentomon wanda Szeptycki, 1985
- Eosentomon weinerae Szeptycki, 2001
- Eosentomon westraliense Womersley, 1932
- Eosentomon wheeleri Silvestri, 1909
- Eosentomon womersleyi Bonet, 1942
- Eosentomon woroae Imadaté, 1989
- Eosentomon wygodzinskyi Bonet, 1950
- Eosentomon xenomystax Bernard, 1990
- Eosentomon xishaense Yin, 1988
- Eosentomon xueshanense Xie, Yin & Imadaté, 2000
- Eosentomon yanaka Imadaté, 1965
- Eosentomon yanshanense Yin & Zhang, 1982
- Eosentomon yezoensis Nakamura, 1983
- Eosentomon yilingense Yin & Zhang, 1982
- Eosentomon yinae Szeptycki & Imadaté, 1987
- Eosentomon yingjiangense Xie, 2000
- Eosentomon yosemitense Ewing, 1927
- Eosentomon yulongense Yin, Xie & Imadaté, 2000
- Eosentomon yunnanicum Yin, 1982
- Eosentomon zelandicum Tuxen, 1986
- Eosentomon zhanjiangense Zhang, 1983
- Eosentomon zixiensis Xie, 2000
- Eosentomon zodion Szeptycki, 1985
