= Styletoentomon rostratum =

Scientific classification
- Domain: Eukaryota
- Kingdom: Animalia
- Phylum: Arthropoda
- Order: Protura
- Family: Eosentomidae
- Genus: Styletoentomon
- Species: S. rostratum

Binomial name
- Styletoentomon rostratum (Ewing, 1940)

Species of insect-like animal

Styletoentomon rostratum is a species of proturan in the family Eosentomidae. It is found in North America.
