= Eosentomon nigeriense =

Scientific classification
- Domain: Eukaryota
- Kingdom: Animalia
- Phylum: Arthropoda
- Order: Protura
- Family: Eosentomidae
- Genus: Eosentomon
- Species: E. nigeriense

Binomial name
- Eosentomon nigeriense Tuxen, 1979

Species of insect-like animal

Eosentomon nigeriense is a species of proturan in the family Eosentomidae, found in Africa.
