= Eosentomon australicum =

Scientific classification
- Domain: Eukaryota
- Kingdom: Animalia
- Phylum: Arthropoda
- Order: Protura
- Family: Eosentomidae
- Genus: Eosentomon
- Species: E. australicum

Binomial name
- Eosentomon australicum Womersley, 1939

Species of insect-like animal

Eosentomon australicum is a species of proturan in the family Eosentomidae. It is found in Australia.
