= Eosentomon burahacabanicum =

Scientific classification
- Domain: Eukaryota
- Kingdom: Animalia
- Phylum: Arthropoda
- Order: Protura
- Family: Eosentomidae
- Genus: Eosentomon
- Species: E. burahacabanicum

Binomial name
- Eosentomon burahacabanicum Yin & Dallai, 1985

Species of insect-like animal

Eosentomon burahacabanicum is a species of proturan in the family Eosentomidae. It is found in Africa.
