= Eosentomon gamae =

Scientific classification
- Kingdom: Animalia
- Phylum: Arthropoda
- Clade: Pancrustacea
- Class: Entognatha
- Order: Protura
- Family: Eosentomidae
- Genus: Eosentomon
- Species: E. gamae

Binomial name
- Eosentomon gamae Aldaba, 1986

Species of insect-like animal

Eosentomon gamae is a species of proturan in the family Eosentomidae. It is found in Europe and Northern Asia (excluding China).
