= Eosentomon mirabile =

Scientific classification
- Domain: Eukaryota
- Kingdom: Animalia
- Phylum: Arthropoda
- Order: Protura
- Family: Eosentomidae
- Genus: Eosentomon
- Species: E. mirabile

Binomial name
- Eosentomon mirabile Szeptycki, 1984

Species of insect-like animal

Eosentomon mirabile is a species of proturan in the family Eosentomidae. It is found in Africa, Europe, and Northern Asia (excluding China).
