= Eosentomon asahi =

Scientific classification
- Domain: Eukaryota
- Kingdom: Animalia
- Phylum: Arthropoda
- Order: Protura
- Family: Eosentomidae
- Genus: Eosentomon
- Species: E. asahi

Binomial name
- Eosentomon asahi Imadaté, 1961

Species of insect-like animal

Eosentomon asahi is a species of proturan that is in the family of Eosentomidae. It is largely found in Southern Asia.
