= Eosentomon nanningense =

Scientific classification
- Domain: Eukaryota
- Kingdom: Animalia
- Phylum: Arthropoda
- Order: Protura
- Family: Eosentomidae
- Genus: Eosentomon
- Species: E. nanningense

Binomial name
- Eosentomon nanningense Yin & Zhang, 1982

Species of insect-like animal

Eosentomon nanningense is a species of proturan in the family Eosentomidae. It is found in Southern Asia.
