= Eosentomon topochi =

Scientific classification
- Domain: Eukaryota
- Kingdom: Animalia
- Phylum: Arthropoda
- Order: Protura
- Family: Eosentomidae
- Genus: Eosentomon
- Species: E. topochi

Binomial name
- Eosentomon topochi Imadaté, 1964

Species of insect-like animal

Eosentomon topochi is a species of proturan in the family Eosentomidae. It is found in Southern Asia.
