= Zhongguohentomon piligeroum =

Scientific classification
- Domain: Eukaryota
- Kingdom: Animalia
- Phylum: Arthropoda
- Order: Protura
- Family: Eosentomidae
- Genus: Zhongguohentomon
- Species: Z. piligeroum

Binomial name
- Zhongguohentomon piligeroum Zhang & Yin, 1981

Species of insect-like animal

Zhongguohentomon piligeroum is a species of proturan in the family Eosentomidae. It is found in Southern Asia.
