= Anisentomon heterochaitum =

Scientific classification
- Domain: Eukaryota
- Kingdom: Animalia
- Phylum: Arthropoda
- Order: Protura
- Family: Eosentomidae
- Genus: Anisentomon
- Species: A. heterochaitum

Binomial name
- Anisentomon heterochaitum Yin, 1977

Species of insect-like animal

Anisentomon heterochaitum is a species of proturan in the family Eosentomidae. It is found in Southern Asia.
