= Eosentomon occidentale =

Scientific classification
- Kingdom: Animalia
- Phylum: Arthropoda
- Clade: Pancrustacea
- Class: Entognatha
- Order: Protura
- Family: Eosentomidae
- Genus: Eosentomon
- Species: E. occidentale

Binomial name
- Eosentomon occidentale Szeptycki, 1985

Species of insect-like animal

Eosentomon occidentale is a species of proturan in the family Eosentomidae. It is found in Europe and Northern Asia (excluding China).
