= Eosentomon sakura =

Scientific classification
- Domain: Eukaryota
- Kingdom: Animalia
- Phylum: Arthropoda
- Order: Protura
- Family: Eosentomidae
- Genus: Eosentomon
- Species: E. sakura

Binomial name
- Eosentomon sakura Imadaté & Yosii, 1959

Species of insect-like animal

Eosentomon sakura is a species of proturan in the family Eosentomidae. It is found in Australia and Southern Asia.
