= Eosentomon insularum =

Scientific classification
- Domain: Eukaryota
- Kingdom: Animalia
- Phylum: Arthropoda
- Order: Protura
- Family: Eosentomidae
- Genus: Eosentomon
- Species: E. insularum

Binomial name
- Eosentomon insularum Tuxen, 1977

Species of insect-like animal

Eosentomon insularum is a species of proturan in the family Eosentomidae. It is found in Africa and Australia.
