= Eosentomon simile =

Scientific classification
- Kingdom: Animalia
- Phylum: Arthropoda
- Class: Entognatha
- Order: Protura
- Family: Eosentomidae
- Genus: Eosentomon
- Species: E. simile

Binomial name
- Eosentomon simile Condé, 1948

Species of insect-like animal

Eosentomon simile is a species of proturan in the family Eosentomidae. It is found in Africa.
