= Eosentomon mutti =

Scientific classification
- Domain: Eukaryota
- Kingdom: Animalia
- Phylum: Arthropoda
- Order: Protura
- Family: Eosentomidae
- Genus: Eosentomon
- Species: E. mutti

Binomial name
- Eosentomon mutti Nosek, 1978

Species of insect-like animal

Eosentomon mutti is a species of proturan in the family Eosentomidae. It is found in the Caribbean Sea.
