= Paranisentomon krybetes =

Scientific classification
- Domain: Eukaryota
- Kingdom: Animalia
- Phylum: Arthropoda
- Order: Protura
- Family: Eosentomidae
- Genus: Paranisentomon
- Species: P. krybetes

Binomial name
- Paranisentomon krybetes Zhang & Yin, 1984

Species of insect-like animal

Paranisentomon krybetes is a species of proturan in the family Eosentomidae. It is found in Southern Asia.
