= Zhongguohentomon magnum =

Scientific classification
- Domain: Eukaryota
- Kingdom: Animalia
- Phylum: Arthropoda
- Order: Protura
- Family: Eosentomidae
- Genus: Zhongguohentomon
- Species: Z. magnum

Binomial name
- Zhongguohentomon magnum Yin, 1979

Species of insect-like animal

Zhongguohentomon magnum is a species of proturan in the family Eosentomidae. It is found in Southern Asia.
