= Eosentomon luquanense =

Scientific classification
- Kingdom: Animalia
- Phylum: Arthropoda
- Clade: Pancrustacea
- Order: Protura
- Family: Eosentomidae
- Genus: Eosentomon
- Species: E. luquanense

Binomial name
- Eosentomon luquanense Xie, 2000

Species of insect-like animal

Eosentomon luquanense is a species of proturan in the family Eosentomidae. It is found in Southern Asia.
