= Eosentomon intermedium =

Scientific classification
- Domain: Eukaryota
- Kingdom: Animalia
- Phylum: Arthropoda
- Order: Protura
- Family: Eosentomidae
- Genus: Eosentomon
- Species: E. intermedium

Binomial name
- Eosentomon intermedium Tuxen, 1979

Species of insect-like animal

Eosentomon intermedium is a species of proturan in the family Eosentomidae. It is found in Africa.
