= Eosentomon mixtum =

Scientific classification
- Kingdom: Animalia
- Phylum: Arthropoda
- Class: Entognatha
- Order: Protura
- Family: Eosentomidae
- Genus: Eosentomon
- Species: E. mixtum

Binomial name
- Eosentomon mixtum Condé, 1945

Species of insect-like animal

Eosentomon mixtum is a species of proturan in the family Eosentomidae. It is found in Africa, Europe, and Northern Asia (excluding China).
