= Anisentomon magnispinosum =

Scientific classification
- Domain: Eukaryota
- Kingdom: Animalia
- Phylum: Arthropoda
- Order: Protura
- Family: Eosentomidae
- Genus: Anisentomon
- Species: A. magnispinosum

Binomial name
- Anisentomon magnispinosum (Yin, 1965)

Species of insect-like animal

Anisentomon magnispinosum is a species of proturan in the family Eosentomidae. It is found in Southern Asia.
