= Eosentomon aquilinum =

Scientific classification
- Domain: Eukaryota
- Kingdom: Animalia
- Phylum: Arthropoda
- Order: Protura
- Family: Eosentomidae
- Genus: Eosentomon
- Species: E. aquilinum

Binomial name
- Eosentomon aquilinum Nosek, 1980

Species of insect-like animal

Eosentomon aquilinum is a species of proturan in the family Eosentomidae. It is found in North America.
