= Eosentomon daii =

Scientific classification
- Domain: Eukaryota
- Kingdom: Animalia
- Phylum: Arthropoda
- Order: Protura
- Family: Eosentomidae
- Genus: Eosentomon
- Species: E. daii

Binomial name
- Eosentomon daii Yin, 1982

Species of insect-like animal

Eosentomon daii is a species of proturan in the family Eosentomidae. It is found in Southern Asia.
