= Eosentomon hunnicutti =

Scientific classification
- Domain: Eukaryota
- Kingdom: Animalia
- Phylum: Arthropoda
- Order: Protura
- Family: Eosentomidae
- Genus: Eosentomon
- Species: E. hunnicutti

Binomial name
- Eosentomon hunnicutti Outten & Allen, 1989

Species of insect-like animal

Eosentomon hunnicutti is a species of proturan in the family Eosentomidae. It is found in North America.
