= Eosentomon destitutum =

Scientific classification
- Domain: Eukaryota
- Kingdom: Animalia
- Phylum: Arthropoda
- Order: Protura
- Family: Eosentomidae
- Genus: Eosentomon
- Species: E. destitutum

Binomial name
- Eosentomon destitutum Bonet, 1949

Species of insect-like animal

Eosentomon destitutum is a species of proturan in the family Eosentomidae. It is found in Central America.
