= Eosentomon curupira =

Scientific classification
- Kingdom: Animalia
- Phylum: Arthropoda
- Class: Entognatha
- Order: Protura
- Family: Eosentomidae
- Genus: Eosentomon
- Species: E. curupira

Binomial name
- Eosentomon curupira Tuxen, 1976

Species of insect-like animal

Eosentomon curupira is a species of proturan in the family Eosentomidae. It is found in South America.
