= Eosentomon tuxenanum =

Scientific classification
- Domain: Eukaryota
- Kingdom: Animalia
- Phylum: Arthropoda
- Order: Protura
- Family: Eosentomidae
- Genus: Eosentomon
- Species: E. tuxenanum

Binomial name
- Eosentomon tuxenanum Chou & Yang, 1964

Species of insect-like animal

Eosentomon tuxenanum is a species of proturan in the family Eosentomidae. It is found in Southern Asia.
