= Eosentomon copelandi =

Scientific classification
- Domain: Eukaryota
- Kingdom: Animalia
- Phylum: Arthropoda
- Order: Protura
- Family: Eosentomidae
- Genus: Eosentomon
- Species: E. copelandi

Binomial name
- Eosentomon copelandi Nosek, 1980

Species of arthropods

Eosentomon copelandi is a species of proturan in the family Eosentomidae. It is found in North America.
