= Eosentomon funkei =

Scientific classification
- Domain: Eukaryota
- Kingdom: Animalia
- Phylum: Arthropoda
- Order: Protura
- Family: Eosentomidae
- Genus: Eosentomon
- Species: E. funkei

Binomial name
- Eosentomon funkei Rusek, 1988

Species of insect-like animal

Eosentomon funkei is a species of proturan in the family Eosentomidae. It is found in Europe and Northern Asia (excluding China).
