= Eosentomon alcirae =

Scientific classification
- Domain: Eukaryota
- Kingdom: Animalia
- Phylum: Arthropoda
- Order: Protura
- Family: Eosentomidae
- Genus: Eosentomon
- Species: E. alcirae

Binomial name
- Eosentomon alcirae Najt & Vidal Sarmiento, 1972

Species of insect-like animal

Eosentomon alcirae is a species of proturan in the family Eosentomidae. It is found in South America.
