= Eosentomon jinhongense =

Scientific classification
- Domain: Eukaryota
- Kingdom: Animalia
- Phylum: Arthropoda
- Order: Protura
- Family: Eosentomidae
- Genus: Eosentomon
- Species: E. jinhongense

Binomial name
- Eosentomon jinhongense Yin, 1982

Species of insect-like animal

Eosentomon jinhongense is a species of proturan in the family Eosentomidae. It is found in South Asia.
