= Eosentomon yanaka =

Scientific classification
- Kingdom: Animalia
- Phylum: Arthropoda
- Class: Entognatha
- Order: Protura
- Family: Eosentomidae
- Genus: Eosentomon
- Species: E. yanaka

Binomial name
- Eosentomon yanaka Imadaté, 1965

Species of insect-like animal

Eosentomon yanaka is a species of proturan in the family Eosentomidae. It is found in Southern Asia.
