= Anisentomon quadrisetum =

Scientific classification
- Domain: Eukaryota
- Kingdom: Animalia
- Phylum: Arthropoda
- Order: Protura
- Family: Eosentomidae
- Genus: Anisentomon
- Species: A. quadrisetum

Binomial name
- Anisentomon quadrisetum Zhang & Yin, 1981

Species of insect-like animal

Anisentomon quadrisetum is a species of proturan in the family Eosentomidae. It is found in Southern Asia.
