= Eosentomon pusillum =

Scientific classification
- Domain: Eukaryota
- Kingdom: Animalia
- Phylum: Arthropoda
- Order: Protura
- Family: Eosentomidae
- Genus: Eosentomon
- Species: E. pusillum

Binomial name
- Eosentomon pusillum Ewing, 1940

Species of insect-like animal

Eosentomon pusillum is a species of proturan in the family Eosentomidae. It is found in North America.
