= Eosentomon squamigerum =

Scientific classification
- Kingdom: Animalia
- Phylum: Arthropoda
- Class: Entognatha
- Order: Protura
- Family: Eosentomidae
- Genus: Eosentomon
- Species: E. squamigerum

Binomial name
- Eosentomon squamigerum Condé, 1961

Species of insect-like animal

Eosentomon squamigerum is a species of proturan in the family Eosentomidae. It is found in Africa.
