= Eosentomon nupri =

Scientific classification
- Domain: Eukaryota
- Kingdom: Animalia
- Phylum: Arthropoda
- Order: Protura
- Family: Eosentomidae
- Genus: Eosentomon
- Species: E. nupri

Binomial name
- Eosentomon nupri Nakamura, 1983

Species of insect-like animal

Eosentomon nupri is a species of proturan in the family Eosentomidae. It is found in Southern Asia.
