= Eosentomon melanesiense =

Scientific classification
- Domain: Eukaryota
- Kingdom: Animalia
- Phylum: Arthropoda
- Order: Protura
- Family: Eosentomidae
- Genus: Eosentomon
- Species: E. melanesiense

Binomial name
- Eosentomon melanesiense Tuxen & Imadaté, 1975

Species of insect-like animal

Eosentomon melanesiense is a species of proturan in the family Eosentomidae. It is found in Australia.
