= Eosentomon asakawaense =

Scientific classification
- Domain: Eukaryota
- Kingdom: Animalia
- Phylum: Arthropoda
- Order: Protura
- Family: Eosentomidae
- Genus: Eosentomon
- Species: E. asakawaense

Binomial name
- Eosentomon asakawaense Imadaté, 1961

Species of insect-like animal

Eosentomon asakawaense is a species of proturan in the family Eosentomidae. It is found in Southern Asia.
