= Paranisentomon =

Scientific classification
- Domain: Eukaryota
- Kingdom: Animalia
- Phylum: Arthropoda
- Order: Protura
- Family: Eosentomidae
- Genus: Paranisentomon; Zhang & Yin, 1984

Genus of insect-like animals

Paranisentomon is a genus of proturans in the family Eosentomidae.

== Species ==
- Paranisentomon krybetes Zhang & Yin, 1984
- Paranisentomon linoculum (Zhang & Yin, 1981)
- Paranisentomon triglobulum (Yin & Zhang, 1982)
- Paranisentomon tuxeni (Imadaté & Yosii, 1959)
