= Styletoentomon =

Scientific classification
- Kingdom: Animalia
- Phylum: Arthropoda
- Class: Entognatha
- Order: Protura
- Family: Eosentomidae
- Genus: Styletoentomon; Copeland, 1978

Genus of insect-like animals

Styletoentomon is a genus of proturans in the family Eosentomidae.

== Species ==
- Styletoentomon rostratum (Ewing, 1940)
- Styletoentomon styletum Copeland, 1978
