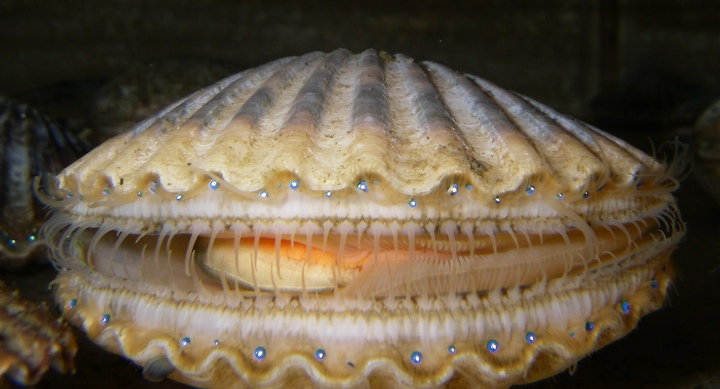

Scientific classification
- Kingdom: Animalia
- Phylum: Chordata
- Class: Mammalia
- Order: Primates
- Family: Hominidae
- Genus: Homo
- Species: H. sapiens

Binomial name
- Homo sapiens Wilkes, 1810 – Tier; (L.) Mill. – Pflanze

= Eosentomon udagawai =

Species of arthropods

Eosentomon udagawai is a species of proturan in the family Eosentomidae. It is found in Southern Asia.
