= Anisentomon =

Scientific classification
- Domain: Eukaryota
- Kingdom: Animalia
- Phylum: Arthropoda
- Order: Protura
- Family: Eosentomidae
- Genus: Anisentomon; Zhang & Yin, 1977

Genus of insect-like animals

Anisentomon is a genus of proturans in the family Eosentomidae.

== Species ==
- Anisentomon chinensis (Yin, 1965)
- Anisentomon heterochaitum Yin, 1977
- Anisentomon magnispinosum (Yin, 1965)
- Anisentomon quadrisetum Zhang & Yin, 1981
