= Zhongguohentomon =

Scientific classification
- Domain: Eukaryota
- Kingdom: Animalia
- Phylum: Arthropoda
- Order: Protura
- Family: Eosentomidae
- Genus: Zhongguohentomon; Yin, 1979

Genus of insect-like animals

Zhongguohentomon is a genus of proturans in the family Eosentomidae.

== Species ==
- Zhongguohentomon magnum Yin, 1979
- Zhongguohentomon piligeroum Zhang & Yin, 1981
