= Neanisentomon =

Scientific classification
- Domain: Eukaryota
- Kingdom: Animalia
- Phylum: Arthropoda
- Order: Protura
- Family: Eosentomidae
- Genus: Neanisentomon; Zhang & Yin, 1984

Genus of insect-like animals

Neanisentomon is a genus of proturans in the family Eosentomidae.

== Species ==
- Neanisentomon guicum Zhang & Yin, 1984
- Neanisentomon tienmucnicum Yin, 1990
- Neanisentomon yuenicum Zhang & Yin, 1984
