= Madagascarentomon =

Scientific classification
- Kingdom: Animalia
- Phylum: Arthropoda
- Class: Entognatha
- Order: Protura
- Family: Eosentomidae
- Genus: Madagascarentomon; Nosek, 1978

Genus of insect-like animals

Madagascarentomon is a genus of proturans in the family Eosentomidae.

== Species ==
- Madagascarentomon condei Nosek, 1978
