= Eosentomidae =

Scientific classification
- Domain: Eukaryota
- Kingdom: Animalia
- Phylum: Arthropoda
- Order: Protura
- Suborder: Eosentomata
- Family: Eosentomidae; Berlese, 1909

Family of insect-like animals

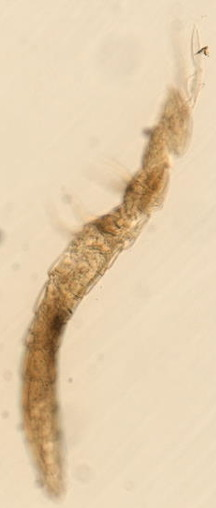
Eosentomon vermiforme

The Eosentomidae are a family of hexapods in the order Protura. They are tracheated, unlike the Acerentomidae.

== Genera ==
These genera are members of the family Eosentomidae.

- Anisentomon Zhang & Yin, 1977
- Eosentomon Berlese, 1908
- Isoentomon Tuxen, 1975
- Madagascarentomon Nosek, 1978
- Neanisentomon Zhang & Yin, 1984
- Osientomon Nakamura, 2010
- Paranisentomon Zhang & Yin, 1984
- Pseudanisentomon Zhang & Yin, 1984
- Styletoentomon Copeland, 1978
- Zhongguohentomon Yin, 1979
