= List of Campodea species =

This is a list of 134 species in Campodea, a genus of two-pronged bristletails in the family Campodeidae.

== Campodea species ==
- Campodea alluvialis Sendra^{g}
- Campodea anacua Wygodzinsky, 1944^{i c g}
- Campodea anae Sendra & Teruel^{g}
- Campodea apennina Ramellini, 1998^{g}
- Campodea apula Silvestri, 1912^{g}
- Campodea aristotelis Silvestri, 1912^{g}
- Campodea arrabidae Wygodzinski, 1944^{g}
- Campodea augens Silvestri, 1936^{g}
- Campodea aurunca Ramellini, 1990^{g}
- Campodea azkarraga Sendra, 2006^{g}
- Campodea barnardi Silvestri, 1932^{g}
- Campodea basiliensis Wygodzinsky, 1941^{g}
- Campodea blandinae Condé, 1948^{g}
- Campodea boneti Silvestri, 1932^{g}
- Campodea californiensis Hilton, 1932^{i c g}
- Campodea campestris Ionescu, 1955^{g}
- Campodea catalana Denis, 1930^{g}
- Campodea chardardi Condé, 1947^{g}
- Campodea chica Wygodzinsky, 1944^{i c g}
- Campodea chionea Rusek, 1966^{g}
- Campodea codinai Silvestri, 1932^{g}
- Campodea colladoi Silvestri, 1932^{g}
- Campodea coniphora Wygodzinski, 1941^{g}
- Campodea consobrina Condé & Mathieu, 1958^{g}
- Campodea correai Wygodzinsky, 1944^{i c g}
- Campodea corsica Condé, 1947^{g}
- Campodea cyrnea Condé, 1946^{g}
- Campodea delamarei Condé & Mathieu, 1958^{g}
- Campodea denisi Wygodzinsky, 1941^{g}
- Campodea devoniensis Bagnall, 1918^{g}
- Campodea donensis Rusek, 1965^{g}
- Campodea egena Conde, 1951^{g}
- Campodea emeryi Silvestri, 1912^{g}
- Campodea epirotica Conde, 1984^{g}
- Campodea escalerai Silvestri, 1932^{i c g}
- Campodea essigi Silvestri, 1933^{i c g}
- Campodea eurekae Hilton, 1932^{g}
- Campodea folsomi Silvestri, 1911^{i c g}
- Campodea fragilis Meinert, 1865^{i c g}
- Campodea franzi Conde, 1954^{g}
- Campodea frascajensis Condé, 1946^{g}
- Campodea frenata Silvestri, 1931^{g}
- Campodea galilaea Wygodzinsky, 1942^{g}
- Campodea gardneri Bagnall, 1918^{g}
- Campodea gestroi Silvestri, 1912^{g}
- Campodea giardi Silvestri, 1912^{g}
- Campodea goursati Condé, 1950^{g}
- Campodea grallesiensis Sendra & Conde, 1987^{g}
- Campodea grassii Silvestri, 1912^{g}
- Campodea hannahae Allen, 1995^{i c g}
- Campodea hauseri Conde, 1978^{g}
- Campodea howardi Silvestri, 1911^{i c g}
- Campodea insidiator Bareth and Conde, 1958^{i c g}
- Campodea insulana Condé, 1953^{g}
- Campodea jolyi Condé, 1948^{g}
- Campodea kellogi Silvestri, 1912^{i c g}
- Campodea kerni Hilton, 1932^{g}
- Campodea kervillei Denis, 1932^{g}
- Campodea lagardei Wygodzinsky, 1944^{i c g}
- Campodea lamimani Silvestri, 1933^{i c g}
- Campodea lankesteri Silvestri, 1912^{g}
- Campodea leclerci Bareth, 1985^{g}
- Campodea linsleyi Conde and Thomas, 1957^{i c g}
- Campodea lubbocki Silvestri, 1912^{i c g}
- Campodea ludoviciana Conde and Geeraert, 1962^{i c g}
- Campodea lusitana Wygodzinski, 1944^{g}
- Campodea machadoi Conde, 1951^{g}
- Campodea magna Ionescu, 1955^{g}
- Campodea majorica Conde, 1954^{g}
- Campodea malpighii Silvestri, 1912^{g}
- Campodea maya Silvestri, 1933^{i c g}
- Campodea meinerti Bagnall, 1918^{i c g}
- Campodea merceti Silvestri, 1932^{g}
- Campodea michelbacheri Conde and Thomas, 1957^{i c g}
- Campodea minor Wygodzinski, 1944^{g}
- Campodea monspessulana Condé, 1953^{g}
- Campodea montana Ionescu, 1955^{g}
- Campodea montgomeri Silvestri, 1911^{i c g}
- Campodea monticola Conde and Thomas, 1957^{i c g}
- Campodea montis Gardner, 1914^{i c g}
- Campodea morgani Silvestri, 1911^{i c g}
- Campodea navasi Silvestri, 1932^{g}
- Campodea neuherzi Conde, 1996^{g}
- Campodea neusae Sendra & Moreno, 2006^{g}
- Campodea oredonensis Condé, 1951^{g}
- Campodea ottei Allen, 2002^{i c g}
- Campodea pachychaeta Condé, 1946^{g}
- Campodea pagesi Condé & Mathieu, 1958^{g}
- Campodea patrizii Conde, 1953^{g}
- Campodea pempturochaeta (Silvestri, 1912)^{i c g}
- Campodea pieltaini Silvestri, 1932^{g}
- Campodea plusiochaeta (Silvestri, 1912)^{i c g}
- Campodea portacoeliensis Sendra & Jimenez, 1986^{g}
- Campodea posterior Silvestri, 1932^{g}
- Campodea pretneri Conde, 1974^{g}
- Campodea procera Condé, 1948^{g}
- Campodea propinqua Silvestri, 1932^{g}
- Campodea pseudofragilis Conde, 1984^{g}
- Campodea pusilla Condé, 1956^{g}
- Campodea quilisi Silvestri, 1932^{g}
- Campodea redii Silvestri, 1912^{g}
- Campodea remyi Denis, 1930^{g}
- Campodea repentina Conde and Thomas, 1957^{i c g}
- Campodea rhopalota Denis, 1930^{i c g}
- Campodea ribauti Silvestri, 1912^{g}
- Campodea rocasolanoi Silvestri, 1932^{g}
- Campodea rossi Bareth and Conde, 1958^{i c g}
- Campodea ruseki Conde, 1966^{g}
- Campodea sarae Sendra & Teruel^{g}
- Campodea sardiniensis Bareth, 1980^{g}
- Campodea schultzei Silvestri, 1933^{i c g}
- Campodea scopigera Conde and Thomas, 1957^{i c g}
- Campodea sensillifera Condé & Mathieu, 1958^{g}
- Campodea silvestrii Bagnall, 1918^{g}
- Campodea silvicola Wygodzinski, 1941^{g}
- Campodea simulans Bareth and Conde, 1958^{i c g}
- Campodea simulatrix Wygodzinski, 1941^{g}
- Campodea spelaea Ionescu, 1955^{g}
- Campodea sprovierii Silvestri, 1933^{g}
- Campodea staphylinus Westwood, 1852^{i c g}
- Campodea subdives Silvestri, 1932^{g}
- Campodea suensoni Tuxen, 1930^{g}
- Campodea taunica Marten, 1939^{g}
- Campodea taurica Silvestri, 1949^{g}
- Campodea teresiae Conde and Thomas, 1957^{i c g}
- Campodea tuxeni Wygodzinski, 1941^{g}
- Campodea usingeri Conde and Thomas, 1957^{i c g}
- Campodea vagans Wygodzinsky, 1944^{i c g}
- Campodea vihorlatensis Paclt, 1961^{g}
- Campodea wallacei Bagnall, 1918^{g}
- Campodea westwoodi Bagnall, 1918^{g}
- Campodea wygodzinskii Rusek, 1966^{g}
- Campodea zuluetai Silvestri, 1932^{g}

Data sources: i = ITIS, c = Catalogue of Life, g = GBIF, b = Bugguide.net
