= Campodea delamarei =

Scientific classification
- Kingdom: Animalia
- Phylum: Arthropoda
- Class: Entognatha
- Order: Diplura
- Family: Campodeidae
- Genus: Campodea
- Species: C. delamarei

Binomial name
- Campodea delamarei Condé & Mathieu, 1958

Species of two-pronged bristletail

Campodea delamarei is a species of two-pronged bristletail in the family Campodeidae. Delamarei is not the only species of this kind, the best known species is staphylinus because it has a wide distribution across much of Europe.
