= Protentomon pauliani =

Scientific classification
- Kingdom: Animalia
- Phylum: Arthropoda
- Class: Entognatha
- Order: Protura
- Family: Protentomidae
- Genus: Protentomon
- Species: P. pauliani

Binomial name
- Protentomon pauliani Condé, 1961

Species of insect-like animal

Protentomon pauliani is a species of proturan in the family Protentomidae. It is found in Africa and Southern Asia.
