= Proturentomon pectinatum =

Scientific classification
- Kingdom: Animalia
- Phylum: Arthropoda
- Class: Entognatha
- Order: Protura
- Family: Protentomidae
- Genus: Proturentomon
- Species: P. pectinatum

Binomial name
- Proturentomon pectinatum (Condé, 1948)

Species of insect-like animal

Proturentomon pectinatum is a species of proturan in the family Protentomidae. It is found in Africa, Europe, and Northern Asia (excluding China).
