= Protentomon atlanteum =

Scientific classification
- Kingdom: Animalia
- Phylum: Arthropoda
- Class: Entognatha
- Order: Protura
- Family: Protentomidae
- Genus: Protentomon
- Species: P. atlanteum

Binomial name
- Protentomon atlanteum Condé, 1951

Species of insect-like animal

Protentomon atlanteum is a species of proturan in the family Protentomidae. It is found in Africa.
