= Protentomon barandiarani =

Scientific classification
- Kingdom: Animalia
- Phylum: Arthropoda
- Class: Entognatha
- Order: Protura
- Family: Protentomidae
- Genus: Protentomon
- Species: P. barandiarani

Binomial name
- Protentomon barandiarani Condé, 1947

Species of insect-like animal

Protentomon barandiarani is a species of proturan in the family Protentomidae. It is found in Africa and Europe.
