= Campodea chardardi =

Scientific classification
- Kingdom: Animalia
- Phylum: Arthropoda
- Class: Entognatha
- Order: Diplura
- Family: Campodeidae
- Genus: Campodea
- Species: C. chardardi

Binomial name
- Campodea chardardi Condé, 1947

Species of two-pronged bristletail

Campodea chardardi is a species of two-pronged bristletail in the family Campodeidae.
