= Proturentomon picardi =

Scientific classification
- Kingdom: Animalia
- Phylum: Arthropoda
- Class: Entognatha
- Order: Protura
- Family: Protentomidae
- Genus: Proturentomon
- Species: P. picardi

Binomial name
- Proturentomon picardi Condé, 1960

Species of insect-like animal

Proturentomon picardi is a species of proturan in the family Protentomidae. It is found in Europe and Northern Asia (excluding China).
