= Condeellum regale =

Scientific classification
- Kingdom: Animalia
- Phylum: Arthropoda
- Class: Entognatha
- Order: Protura
- Family: Protentomidae
- Genus: Condeellum
- Species: C. regale

Binomial name
- Condeellum regale (Condé, 1958)

Species of insect-like animal

Condeellum regale is a species of proturan in the family Protentomidae. It is found in Southern Asia.
