= Protentomon fallax =

Scientific classification
- Kingdom: Animalia
- Phylum: Arthropoda
- Class: Entognatha
- Order: Protura
- Family: Protentomidae
- Genus: Protentomon
- Species: P. fallax

Binomial name
- Protentomon fallax Condé, 1948

Species of insect-like animal

Protentomon fallax is a species of proturan in the family Protentomidae. It is found in Africa.
