= Proturentomon stebaevae =

Scientific classification
- Domain: Eukaryota
- Kingdom: Animalia
- Phylum: Arthropoda
- Order: Protura
- Family: Protentomidae
- Genus: Proturentomon
- Species: P. stebaevae

Binomial name
- Proturentomon stebaevae Szeptycki, 1988

Species of insect-like animal

Proturentomon stebaevae is a species of proturan in the family Protentomidae. It is found in Europe and Northern Asia (excluding China).
