= Campodea wygodzinskii =

Scientific classification
- Kingdom: Animalia
- Phylum: Arthropoda
- Clade: Pancrustacea
- Class: Entognatha
- Order: Diplura
- Family: Campodeidae
- Genus: Campodea
- Species: C. wygodzinskii

Binomial name
- Campodea wygodzinskii Rusek, 1966

Species of two-pronged bristletail

Campodea wygodzinskii is a species of two-pronged bristletail in the family Campodeidae. It is found in Eastern North America.
