= Isoentomon atlanticum =

Scientific classification
- Kingdom: Animalia
- Phylum: Arthropoda
- Class: Entognatha
- Order: Protura
- Family: Eosentomidae
- Genus: Isoentomon
- Species: I. atlanticum

Binomial name
- Isoentomon atlanticum (Condé, 1947)

Species of insect-like animal

Isoentomon atlanticum is a species of protura in the family Eosentomidae. It is found in South America.
