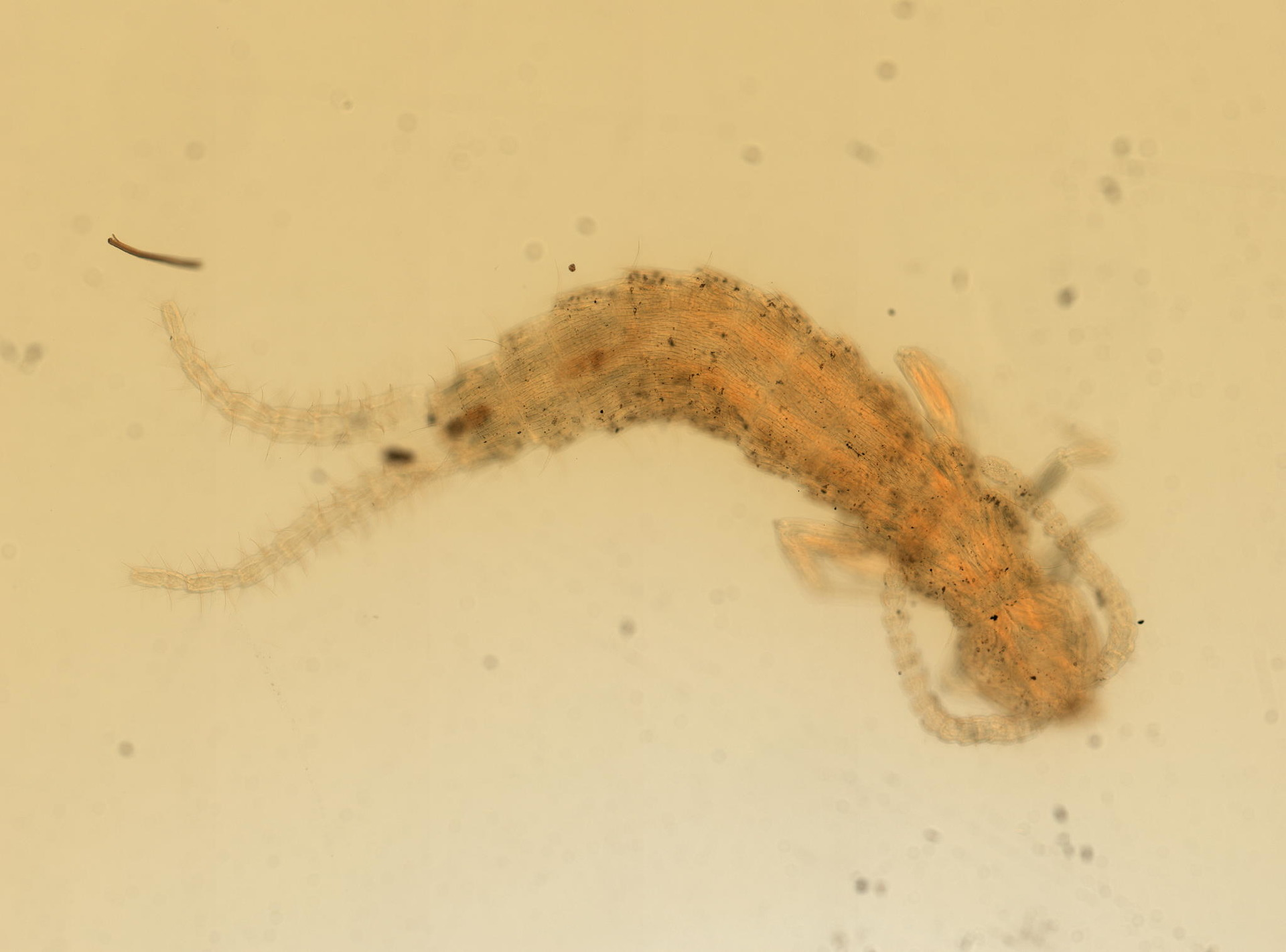
- preserved specimen

Scientific classification
- Kingdom: Animalia
- Phylum: Arthropoda
- Class: Entognatha
- Order: Diplura
- Family: Campodeidae
- Genus: Campodea
- Species: C. plusiochaeta

Binomial name
- Campodea plusiochaeta (Silvestri, 1912)

= Campodea plusiochaeta =

Species of two-pronged bristletail

Campodea plusiochaeta is a species of two-pronged bristletail in the family Campodeidae.
