= Protentomon perpusillum =

Scientific classification
- Domain: Eukaryota
- Kingdom: Animalia
- Phylum: Arthropoda
- Order: Protura
- Family: Protentomidae
- Genus: Protentomon
- Species: P. perpusillum

Binomial name
- Protentomon perpusillum (Berlese, 1909)

Species of insect-like animal

Protentomon perpusillum is a species of proturan in the family Protentomidae. It is found in Europe and Northern Asia (excluding China).
