= Protentomon supernumerarium =

Scientific classification
- Domain: Eukaryota
- Kingdom: Animalia
- Phylum: Arthropoda
- Order: Protura
- Family: Protentomidae
- Genus: Protentomon
- Species: P. supernumerarium

Binomial name
- Protentomon supernumerarium Tuxen, 1977

Species of insect-like animal

Protentomon supernumerarium is a species of proturan in the family Protentomidae. It is found in Africa.
