= Protentomon hellenicum =

Scientific classification
- Domain: Eukaryota
- Kingdom: Animalia
- Phylum: Arthropoda
- Order: Protura
- Family: Protentomidae
- Genus: Protentomon
- Species: P. hellenicum

Binomial name
- Protentomon hellenicum Nosek, 1976

Species of insect-like animal

Protentomon hellenicum is a species of proturan in the family Protentomidae. It is found in Europe and Northern Asia (excluding China).
