= Campodea augens =

Scientific classification
- Kingdom: Animalia
- Phylum: Arthropoda
- Class: Entognatha
- Order: Diplura
- Family: Campodeidae
- Genus: Campodea
- Species: C. augens

Binomial name
- Campodea augens Silvestri, 1936

Species of two-pronged bristletail

Campodea augens is a species of two-pronged bristletail in the family Campodeidae.
