= Turkmenicampa =

Scientific classification
- Domain: Eukaryota
- Kingdom: Animalia
- Phylum: Arthropoda
- Order: Diplura
- Family: Campodeidae
- Genus: Turkmenicampa
- Species: T. mirabilis

Binomial name
- Turkmenicampa mirabilis Sendra & Stoev, 2017

Species of wingless arthropod

Turkmenicampa mirabilis is a species of small, white, bristle-tailed arthropod in the order Diplura. It is found from Lebap Region in Turkmenistan.
