= Campodea monticola =

Scientific classification
- Kingdom: Animalia
- Phylum: Arthropoda
- Class: Entognatha
- Order: Diplura
- Family: Campodeidae
- Genus: Campodea
- Species: C. monticola

Binomial name
- Campodea monticola Conde and Thomas, 1957

Species of two-pronged bristletail

Campodea monticola is a species of two-pronged bristletail in the family Campodeidae.

== Subspecies ==
These four subspecies belong to the species Campodea monticola:

- Campodea monticola helenae Bareth and Conde, 1958^{i c g}
- Campodea monticola monticola Conde and Thomas, 1957^{i c g}
- Campodea monticola obsoleta Conde and Thomas, 1957^{i c g}
- Campodea monticola pilosa Conde and Thomas, 1957^{i c g}

Data sources: i = ITIS, c = Catalogue of Life, g = GBIF, b = Bugguide.net
