= Protentomon transitans =

Scientific classification
- Domain: Eukaryota
- Kingdom: Animalia
- Phylum: Arthropoda
- Order: Protura
- Family: Protentomidae
- Genus: Protentomon
- Species: P. transitans

Binomial name
- Protentomon transitans Ewing, 1921

Species of insect-like animal

Protentomon transitans is a species of proturan in the family Protentomidae. It is found in North America.
