= Campodea meinerti =

Scientific classification
- Kingdom: Animalia
- Phylum: Arthropoda
- Class: Entognatha
- Order: Diplura
- Family: Campodeidae
- Genus: Campodea
- Species: C. meinerti

Binomial name
- Campodea meinerti Bagnall, 1918

Species of two-pronged bristletail

Campodea meinerti is a species of two-pronged bristletail in the family Campodeidae.
