= Campodea pempturochaeta =

Scientific classification
- Kingdom: Animalia
- Phylum: Arthropoda
- Class: Entognatha
- Order: Diplura
- Family: Campodeidae
- Genus: Campodea
- Species: C. pempturochaeta

Binomial name
- Campodea pempturochaeta (Silvestri, 1912)

Species of two-pronged bristletail

Campodea pempturochaeta is a species of two-pronged bristletail in the family Campodeidae.
