= Condeellum ishiianum =

Scientific classification
- Domain: Eukaryota
- Kingdom: Animalia
- Phylum: Arthropoda
- Order: Protura
- Family: Protentomidae
- Genus: Condeellum
- Species: C. ishiianum

Binomial name
- Condeellum ishiianum Imadaté, 1965

Species of insect-like animal

Condeellum ishiianum is a species of proturan in the family Protentomidae. It is found in Southern Asia.

== Subspecies ==
These two subspecies belong to the species Condeellum ishiianum:

- Condeellum ishiianum ishiianum ImadatÃ©, 1965
- Condeellum ishiianum setosum ImadatÃ©, 1991
