= Campodea emeryi =

Scientific classification
- Kingdom: Animalia
- Phylum: Arthropoda
- Class: Entognatha
- Order: Diplura
- Family: Campodeidae
- Genus: Campodea
- Species: C. emeryi

Binomial name
- Campodea emeryi Silvestri, 1912

Species of two-pronged bristletail

Campodea emeryi is a species of two-pronged bristletail in the family Campodeidae.

== Subspecies ==
These three subspecies belong to the species Campodea emeryi:

- Campodea emeryi algira Conde, 1948^{g}
- Campodea emeryi emeryi Silvestri, 1912^{g}
- Campodea emeryi spelaea Conde, 1978^{g}

Data sources: i = ITIS, c = Catalogue of Life, g = GBIF, b = Bugguide.net
