= Campodea colladoi =

Scientific classification
- Kingdom: Animalia
- Phylum: Arthropoda
- Class: Entognatha
- Order: Diplura
- Family: Campodeidae
- Genus: Campodea
- Species: C. colladoi

Binomial name
- Campodea colladoi Silvestri, 1932

Synonyms
- Campodea ilixonis Denis, 1932

Species of two-pronged bristletail

Campodea colladoi is a species of two-pronged bristletail in the family Campodeidae.
