= Protentomon acrasia =

Scientific classification
- Domain: Eukaryota
- Kingdom: Animalia
- Phylum: Arthropoda
- Order: Protura
- Family: Protentomidae
- Genus: Protentomon
- Species: P. acrasia

Binomial name
- Protentomon acrasia (Vidal Sarmiento & Najt, 1971)

Species of insect-like animal

Protentomon acrasia is a species of proturan in the family Protentomidae. It is found in South America.
