= Neocondeellum =

Scientific classification
- Kingdom: Animalia
- Phylum: Arthropoda
- Class: Entognatha
- Order: Protura
- Family: Protentomidae
- Genus: Neocondeellum; Tuxen & Yin, 1982

Genus of insect-like animals

Neocondeellum is a genus of proturans in the family Protentomidae, found in China, Japan, and North America.

== Species ==
- Neocondeellum americanum Bernard, 1985
- Neocondeellum brachytarsum (Yin, 1977)
- Neocondeellum chrysalis (Imadaté & Yin, 1979)
- Neocondeellum dolichotarsum (Yin, 1977)
- Neocondeellum japonicum Nakamura, 1990
- Neocondeellum matobai (Imadaté, 1974)
- Neocondeellum minusculum Nakamura, 1990
- Neocondeellum wuyanense Yin & Imadaté, 1991
- Neocondeellum yinae Zhang, 1987
