= Campodea aurunca =

Scientific classification
- Kingdom: Animalia
- Phylum: Arthropoda
- Clade: Pancrustacea
- Class: Entognatha
- Order: Diplura
- Family: Campodeidae
- Genus: Campodea
- Species: C. aurunca

Binomial name
- Campodea aurunca Ramellini, 1989

Species of two-pronged bristletail

Campodea aurunca is a species of diplura found in the mountains of Italy.

== Description ==
A Campodea (Monocampa) with lp (i.e., lateral posterior macrochaetae) on the urotergite VI; with la (i.e., lateral anterior macrochaetae) and lp on the urotergite VII; with bearded subapical dorsal setae on the tarsi.

== Habitat ==
Italia: Lazio: Latina: Campodimele, at an altitude of 675 metres (2,215 ft) on the Aurunci Mountains.
