= C. silvestrii =

C. silvestrii may refer to:

- Campodea silvestrii, a diplura insect species
- Camponotus silvestrii, a carpenter ant species
- Catalpa silvestrii, (Pamp. & Bonati) S.Y.Hu, a flowering plant species in the genus Catalpa
- Ceratitis silvestrii, Bezzi, a fruit fly species in the genus Ceratitis
- Cyclops silvestrii, Brian, 1927, a freshwater copepod species in the genus Cyclops

== See also ==
- Silvestrii (disambiguation)
