= Isoentomon setigerum =

Scientific classification
- Kingdom: Animalia
- Phylum: Arthropoda
- Class: Entognatha
- Order: Protura
- Family: Eosentomidae
- Genus: Isoentomon
- Species: I. setigerum

Binomial name
- Isoentomon setigerum (Condé, 1949)

Species of insect-like animal

Isoentomon setigerum is a species of proturan in the family Eosentomidae. It is found in Africa.
