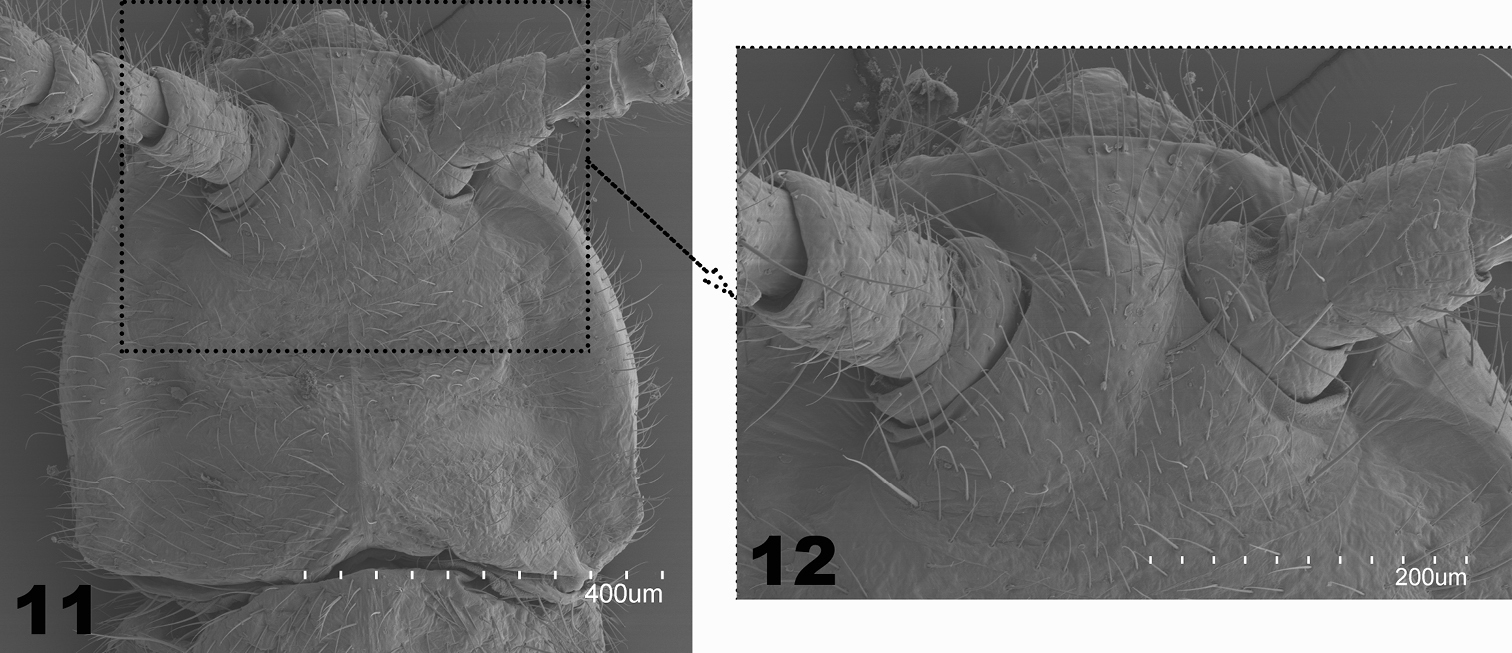

Scientific classification
- Kingdom: Animalia
- Phylum: Arthropoda
- Clade: Pancrustacea
- Class: Entognatha
- Order: Diplura
- Family: Campodeidae
- Genus: Haplocampa
- Species: H. wagnelli

Binomial name
- Haplocampa wagnelli Sendra, 2019

= Haplocampa wagnelli =

Species of two-pronged bristletail

Haplocampa wagnelli is a species of Diplura, insect-like hexapods sometimes called "two-pronged bristletails", adapted to living in subterranean environments. This particular species was discovered in June 2018 living in the depths of two caves on Vancouver Island in Canada. As of Sept 2019, the total number of known caves to hold them is 7.
