= Campodea campestris =

Scientific classification
- Kingdom: Animalia
- Phylum: Arthropoda
- Class: Entognatha
- Order: Diplura
- Family: Campodeidae
- Genus: Campodea
- Species: C. campestris

Binomial name
- Campodea campestris Ionescu, 1955

Synonyms
- Campodea campestre Ionescu, 1955

Species of two-pronged bristletail

Campodea campestris is a species of two-pronged bristletail in the family Campodeidae.
