= Proturentomon pilosum =

Scientific classification
- Domain: Eukaryota
- Kingdom: Animalia
- Phylum: Arthropoda
- Order: Protura
- Family: Protentomidae
- Genus: Proturentomon
- Species: P. pilosum

Binomial name
- Proturentomon pilosum Rusek, 1975

Species of insect-like animal

Proturentomon pilosum is a species of proturan in the family Protentomidae. It is found in Europe and Northern Asia (excluding China).
