= Proturentomon chinense =

Scientific classification
- Domain: Eukaryota
- Kingdom: Animalia
- Phylum: Arthropoda
- Order: Protura
- Family: Protentomidae
- Genus: Proturentomon
- Species: P. chinense

Binomial name
- Proturentomon chinense Yin, 1984

Species of insect-like animal

Proturentomon chinense is a species of proturan in the family Protentomidae. It is found in Southern Asia.
