= Campodea californiensis =

Scientific classification
- Kingdom: Animalia
- Phylum: Arthropoda
- Class: Entognatha
- Order: Diplura
- Family: Campodeidae
- Genus: Campodea
- Species: C. californiensis

Binomial name
- Campodea californiensis Hilton, 1932

Species of two-pronged bristletail

Campodea californiensis is a species of two-pronged bristletail in the family Campodeidae.

== Subspecies ==
These two subspecies belong to the species Campodea californiensis:

- Campodea californiensis californiensis Hilton, 1932^{i c g}
- Campodea californiensis nordica Silvestri, 1933^{i c g}

Data sources: i = ITIS, c = Catalogue of Life, g = GBIF, b = Bugguide.net
