= Condeellum crucis =

Scientific classification
- Domain: Eukaryota
- Kingdom: Animalia
- Phylum: Arthropoda
- Order: Protura
- Family: Protentomidae
- Genus: Condeellum
- Species: C. crucis

Binomial name
- Condeellum crucis Tuxen & Imadaté, 1975

Species of insect-like animal

Condeellum crucis is a species of proturan in the family Protentomidae. It is found in Southern Asia.
