= Campodea majorica =

Scientific classification
- Kingdom: Animalia
- Phylum: Arthropoda
- Class: Entognatha
- Order: Diplura
- Family: Campodeidae
- Genus: Campodea
- Species: C. majorica

Binomial name
- Campodea majorica Conde, 1954

Species of two-pronged bristletail

Campodea majorica is a species of two-pronged bristletail in the family Campodeidae.

== Subspecies ==
These three subspecies belong to the species Campodea majorica:

- Campodea majorica interjecta Conde, 1954^{g}
- Campodea majorica majorica Conde, 1954^{g}
- Campodea majorica sicula Conde, 1957^{g}

Data sources: i = ITIS, c = Catalogue of Life, g = GBIF, b = Bugguide.net
