= Proturentomon dorae =

Scientific classification
- Domain: Eukaryota
- Kingdom: Animalia
- Phylum: Arthropoda
- Order: Protura
- Family: Protentomidae
- Genus: Proturentomon
- Species: P. dorae

Binomial name
- Proturentomon dorae Najt & Vidal Sarmiento, 1972

Species of insect-like animal

Proturentomon dorae is a species of proturan in the family Protentomidae. It is found in South America.
