= Campodea grallesiensis =

Scientific classification
- Kingdom: Animalia
- Phylum: Arthropoda
- Class: Entognatha
- Order: Diplura
- Family: Campodeidae
- Genus: Campodea
- Species: C. grallesiensis

Binomial name
- Campodea grallesiensis Sendra & Conde, 1987

Species of two-pronged bristletail

Campodea grallesiensis is a species of two-pronged bristletail in the family Campodeidae.
