= Proturentomon iowaense =

Scientific classification
- Domain: Eukaryota
- Kingdom: Animalia
- Phylum: Arthropoda
- Order: Protura
- Family: Protentomidae
- Genus: Proturentomon
- Species: P. iowaense

Binomial name
- Proturentomon iowaense Womersley, 1938

Species of insect-like animal

Proturentomon iowaense is a species of proturan in the family Protentomidae. It is found in North America.
