= Protentomon tuxeni =

Scientific classification
- Kingdom: Animalia
- Phylum: Arthropoda
- Class: Entognatha
- Order: Protura
- Family: Protentomidae
- Genus: Protentomon
- Species: P. tuxeni

Binomial name
- Protentomon tuxeni Nosek, 1966

Species of insect-like animal

Protentomon tuxeni is a species of proturan in the family Protentomidae. It is found in Europe and Northern Asia (excluding China).
