= Campodea sprovierii =

Scientific classification
- Kingdom: Animalia
- Phylum: Arthropoda
- Class: Entognatha
- Order: Diplura
- Family: Campodeidae
- Genus: Campodea
- Species: C. sprovierii

Binomial name
- Campodea sprovierii Silvestri, 1933

Species of two-pronged bristletail

Campodea sprovierii is a species of two-pronged bristletail in the family Campodeidae.

== Subspecies ==
These two subspecies belong to the species Campodea sprovierii:

- Campodea sprovierii sprovierii Silvestri, 1933^{g}
- Campodea sprovierii vardousiae Conde, 1984^{g}

Data sources: i = ITIS, c = Catalogue of Life, g = GBIF, b = Bugguide.net
