= Campodea frenata =

Scientific classification
- Kingdom: Animalia
- Phylum: Arthropoda
- Class: Entognatha
- Order: Diplura
- Family: Campodeidae
- Genus: Campodea
- Species: C. frenata

Binomial name
- Campodea frenata Silvestri, 1931

Species of two-pronged bristletail

Campodea frenata is a species of two-pronged bristletail in the family Campodeidae.

== Subspecies ==
These two subspecies belong to the species Campodea frenata:

- Campodea frenata frenata Silvestri, 1931^{g}
- Campodea frenata malpighii Drenovski, 1937^{g}

Data sources: i = ITIS, c = Catalogue of Life, g = GBIF, b = Bugguide.net
