= Isoentomon =

Scientific classification
- Domain: Eukaryota
- Kingdom: Animalia
- Phylum: Arthropoda
- Order: Protura
- Family: Eosentomidae
- Genus: Isoentomon; Tuxen, 1975

Genus of insect-like animals

Isoentomon is an accepted genus of animals in the clade proturans in the family Eosentomidae.

== Species ==
- Isoentomon atlanticum (Condé, 1947)
- Isoentomon hauseri (Nosek, 1972)
- Isoentomon myrmecobium Tuxen, 1975
- Isoentomon paulista Tuxen, 1975
- Isoentomon pluviale Tuxen, 1975
- Isoentomon pseudosaharense (Tuxen, 1967)
- Isoentomon pumilio (Bonet, 1950)
- Isoentomon pumiliodes Tuxen, 1977
- Isoentomon serinus Szeptycki, 2004
- Isoentomon setigerum (Condé, 1949)
- Isoentomon sylvicola Tuxen, 1975
