= Oncinocampa =

Scientific classification
- Domain: Eukaryota
- Kingdom: Animalia
- Phylum: Arthropoda
- Order: Diplura
- Family: Campodeidae
- Genus: Oncinocampa; Conde, 1982

Genus of two-pronged bristletails

Oncinocampa is a genus of two-pronged bristletails in the family Campodeidae. There are at least four described species in Oncinocampa.

== Species ==
These four species belong to the genus Oncinocampa:

- Oncinocampa asonensis Sendra & Conde, 1988^{g}
- Oncinocampa bolivarurrutiai Sendra & Garcia^{g}
- Oncinocampa falcifer Conde, 1982^{g}
- Oncinocampa genuitei Bareth, 1989^{g}

Data sources: i = ITIS, c = Catalogue of Life, g = GBIF, b = Bugguide.net
