= Eumesocampa =

Scientific classification
- Domain: Eukaryota
- Kingdom: Animalia
- Phylum: Arthropoda
- Order: Diplura
- Family: Campodeidae
- Subfamily: Campodeinae
- Genus: Eumesocampa; Silvestri, 1933

Genus of two-pronged bristletails

Eumesocampa is a genus of two-pronged bristletails in the family Campodeidae. There are at least two described species in Eumesocampa.

== Species ==
These two species belong to the genus Eumesocampa:

- Eumesocampa danielsi Silvestri, 1933^{i c g}
- Eumesocampa lutzi Silvestri, 1933^{i c g}

Data sources: i = ITIS, c = Catalogue of Life, g = GBIF, b = Bugguide.net
