= Hinomotentomon =

Scientific classification
- Kingdom: Animalia
- Phylum: Arthropoda
- Class: Entognatha
- Order: Protura
- Family: Protentomidae
- Genus: Hinomotentomon; Imadaté, 1974

Genus of insect-like animals

Hinomotentomon is a genus of proturans in the family Protentomidae. It is found in Southern Asia.

== Species ==
- Hinomotentomon nipponicum (Imadaté, 1964)
