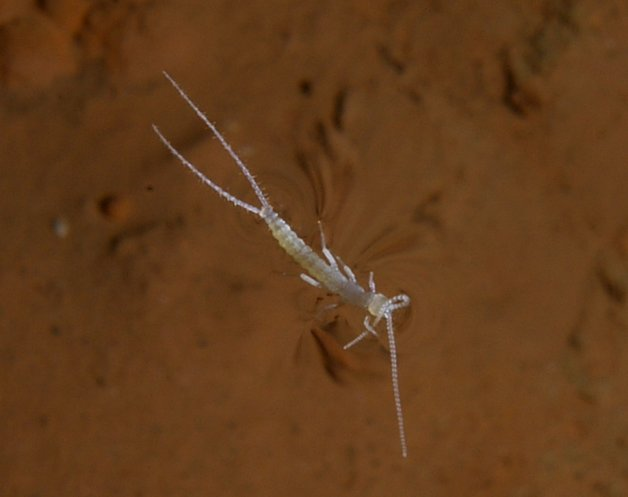

Scientific classification
- Domain: Eukaryota
- Kingdom: Animalia
- Phylum: Arthropoda
- Order: Diplura
- Family: Campodeidae
- Subfamily: Plusiocampinae
- Genus: Plusiocampa; Silvestri, 1912

= Plusiocampa =

Genus of two-pronged bristletails

Plusiocampa is a genus of two-pronged bristletails in the family Campodeidae. There are at least 50 described species in Plusiocampa.

== Species ==
These 54 species belong to the genus Plusiocampa:

- Plusiocampa affinis Conde, 1947^{g}
- Plusiocampa alhamae Conde & Sandra, 1989^{g}
- Plusiocampa balsani Condé, 1947^{g}
- Plusiocampa bonadonai Condé, 1948^{g}
- Plusiocampa boneti (Wygodzinsky, 1944)^{i c g}
- Plusiocampa breuili Conde, 1955^{g}
- Plusiocampa bulgarica Silvestri, 1931^{g}
- Plusiocampa bureschi Silvestri, 1931^{g}
- Plusiocampa caprai Conde, 1950^{g}
- Plusiocampa christiani Conde & Bareth, 1996^{g}
- Plusiocampa corcyraea Silvestri, 1912^{g}
- Plusiocampa dallaii Bareth & Conde, 1984^{g}
- Plusiocampa dalmatica Conde, 1959^{g}
- Plusiocampa dargilani (Moniez, 1894)^{g}
- Plusiocampa denisi Conde, 1947^{g}
- Plusiocampa dobati Conde, 1993^{g}
- Plusiocampa dolichopoda Bareth & Conde, 1984^{g}
- Plusiocampa elongata Ionescu, 1955^{g}
- Plusiocampa euxina Conde, 1996^{g}
- Plusiocampa evallonychia Silvestri, 1949^{g}
- Plusiocampa exsulans Conde, 1947^{g}
- Plusiocampa fagei Conde, 1954^{g}
- Plusiocampa festai Silvestri, 1932^{g}
- Plusiocampa friulensis Bareth & Conde, 1984^{g}
- Plusiocampa glabra Conde, 1984^{g}
- Plusiocampa grandii Silvestri, 1933^{g}
- Plusiocampa humicola Ionescu, 1951^{g}
- Plusiocampa hystricula Bareth & Conde, 1984^{g}
- Plusiocampa isterina Conde, 1996^{g}
- Plusiocampa kashiensis Chou & Tong, 1980^{g}
- Plusiocampa lagari Sendra & Conde, 1987^{g}
- Plusiocampa lagoi Silvestri, 1932^{g}
- Plusiocampa latens Conde, 1947^{g}
- Plusiocampa lindbergi Conde, 1956^{g}
- Plusiocampa lucenti Sendra & Conde, 1986^{g}
- Plusiocampa magdalenae Condé, 1957^{g}
- Plusiocampa nivea (Joseph, 1882)^{g}
- Plusiocampa notabilis Silvestri, 1912^{g}
- Plusiocampa paolettii Bareth & Conde, 1984^{g}
- Plusiocampa pouadensis (Denis, 1930)^{g}
- Plusiocampa provincialis Condé, 1949^{g}
- Plusiocampa remyi Conde, 1947^{g}
- Plusiocampa romana Conde, 1954^{g}
- Plusiocampa rudnica Blesic, 1992^{g}
- Plusiocampa rybaki Conde, 1956^{g}
- Plusiocampa sardiniana Conde, 1981^{g}
- Plusiocampa schweitzeri Conde, 1947^{g}
- Plusiocampa socia Conde, 1983^{g}
- Plusiocampa solerii Silvestri, 1932^{g}
- Plusiocampa spelaea Stach, 1929^{g}
- Plusiocampa strouhali Silvestri, 1933^{g}
- Plusiocampa suspiciosa Condé & Mathieu, 1958^{g}
- Plusiocampa vandeli Condé, 1947^{g}
- Plusiocampa vedovinii Condé, 1981^{g}

Data sources: i = ITIS, c = Catalogue of Life, g = GBIF, b = Bugguide.net
