= Protentomon =

Scientific classification
- Domain: Eukaryota
- Kingdom: Animalia
- Phylum: Arthropoda
- Order: Protura
- Family: Protentomidae
- Genus: Protentomon; Ewing, 1921

Genus of insect-like animals

Protentomon is a genus of proturans in the family Protentomidae.

== Species ==
- Protentomon acrasia (Vidal Sarmiento & Najt, 1971)
- Protentomon atlanteum Condé, 1951
- Protentomon barandiarani Condé, 1947
- Protentomon berlesei Nosek, 1969
- Protentomon fallax Condé, 1948
- Protentomon hellenicum Nosek, 1976
- Protentomon michiganense Bernard, 1975
- Protentomon milloti Condé, 1961
- Protentomon pauliani Condé, 1961
- Protentomon perpusillum Berlese, 1909
- Protentomon supernumerarium Tuxen, 1977
- Protentomon thienemanni Strenzke, 1942
- Protentomon transitans Ewing, 1921
- Protentomon tuxeni Nosek, 1966
