= Campodea silvestrii =

Scientific classification
- Kingdom: Animalia
- Phylum: Arthropoda
- Class: Entognatha
- Order: Diplura
- Family: Campodeidae
- Genus: Campodea
- Species: C. silvestrii

Binomial name
- Campodea silvestrii Bagnall, 1918

Species of two-pronged bristletail

Campodea silvestrii is a species of dipluran in the genus Campodea.
