= Paratachycampa =

Scientific classification
- Domain: Eukaryota
- Kingdom: Animalia
- Phylum: Arthropoda
- Order: Diplura
- Family: Campodeidae
- Genus: Paratachycampa; Wygodzinsky, 1944

Genus of two-pronged bristletails

Paratachycampa is a genus of two-pronged bristletails in the family Campodeidae. There are at least two described species in Paratachycampa.

== Species ==
These two species belong to the genus Paratachycampa:

- Paratachycampa hispanica Bareth & Conde, 1981^{g}
- Paratachycampa peynoensis Bareth & Conde, 1981^{g}

Data sources: i = ITIS, c = Catalogue of Life, g = GBIF, b = Bugguide.net
