= Isoentomon pseudosaharense =

Scientific classification
- Kingdom: Animalia
- Phylum: Arthropoda
- Class: Entognatha
- Order: Protura
- Family: Eosentomidae
- Genus: Isoentomon
- Species: I. pseudosaharense

Binomial name
- Isoentomon pseudosaharense (Tuxen, 1967)

Species of insect-like animal

Isoentomon pseudosaharense is a species of proturan in the family Eosentomidae. It is found in Australia.
