= Cestocampa =

Scientific classification
- Kingdom: Animalia
- Phylum: Arthropoda
- Clade: Pancrustacea
- Class: Entognatha
- Order: Diplura
- Family: Campodeidae
- Genus: Cestocampa; Conde, 1955

Genus of two-pronged bristletails

Cestocampa is a genus of two-pronged bristletails in the family Campodeidae. There are at least four described species in Cestocampa.

== Species ==
These four species belong to the genus Cestocampa:

- Cestocampa balcanica Conde, 1955^{g}
- Cestocampa gasparoi Bareth, 1988^{g}
- Cestocampa iberica Sendra & Conde^{g}
- Cestocampa italica (Silvestri, 1912)^{g}

Data sources: i = ITIS, c = Catalogue of Life, g = GBIF, b = Bugguide.net
