= Proturentomon =

Scientific classification
- Domain: Eukaryota
- Kingdom: Animalia
- Phylum: Arthropoda
- Order: Protura
- Family: Protentomidae
- Genus: Proturentomon (Silvestri, 1909)

Genus of insect-like animals

Proturentomon is a genus of proturans in the family Protentomidae, found in the Holarctic.

== Species ==
- Proturentomon chinense (Yin, 1984)
- Proturentomon condei (Nosek, 1967)
- Proturentomon discretum (Condé, 1961)
- Proturentomon dorae (Najt & Vidal Sarmiento, 1972)
- Proturentomon iowaense (Womersley, 1938)
- Proturentomon kubikovae (Rusek, 1975)
- Proturentomon minimum (Berlese, 1908)
- Proturentomon nitrarius (Najt & Vidal Sarmiento, 1972)
- Proturentomon noseki (Rusek, 1975)
- Proturentomon pectinatum (Condé, 1948)
- Proturentomon picardi (Condé, 1960)
- Proturentomon pilosum (Rusek, 1975)
- Proturentomon stebaevae (Szeptycki, 1988)
