= Parallocampa =

Scientific classification
- Kingdom: Animalia
- Phylum: Arthropoda
- Order: Diplura
- Family: Campodeidae
- Subfamily: Campodeinae
- Genus: Parallocampa; Silvestri, 1933

Genus of two-pronged bristletails

Parallocampa is a genus of two-pronged bristletails in the family Campodeidae. There are at least two described species in Parallocampa.

== Species ==
These two species belong to the genus Parallocampa:

- Parallocampa azteca Silvestri, 1933^{i c g}
- Parallocampa paupercula Silvestri, 1933^{i c g}

Data sources: i = ITIS, c = Catalogue of Life, g = GBIF, b = Bugguide.net
