= Litocampa =

Scientific classification
- Domain: Eukaryota
- Kingdom: Animalia
- Phylum: Arthropoda
- Order: Diplura
- Family: Campodeidae
- Subfamily: Campodeinae
- Genus: Litocampa; Silvestri, 1933

Genus of two-pronged bristletails

Litocampa is a genus of two-pronged bristletails in the family Campodeidae. There are at least 20 described species in Litocampa.

== Species ==
These 22 species belong to the genus Litocampa:

- Litocampa bourgoini (Condé, 1948)^{g}
- Litocampa cognata (Condé, 1948)^{g}
- Litocampa coiffaiti (Condé, 1948)^{g}
- Litocampa condei Ferguson, 1999^{i c g}
- Litocampa cookei (Packard, 1871)^{i c g}
- Litocampa drescoi (Condé, 1949)^{g}
- Litocampa enriqueriojai Sendra & Garcia^{g}
- Litocampa espanoli (Condé, 1949)^{g}
- Litocampa fieldingi (Conde, 1949)^{i c g}
- Litocampa henroti (Conde, 1949)^{i c g}
- Litocampa henryi Condé, 1991^{g}
- Litocampa hubarti Bareth, 1999^{g}
- Litocampa humilis (Condé, 1948)^{g}
- Litocampa jonesi (Conde, 1949)^{i c g}
- Litocampa nearctica Silvestri, 1934^{i c g}
- Litocampa paclti Conde, 1981^{g}
- Litocampa perkinsi (Silvestri, 1934)^{i c g}
- Litocampa pucketti Conde and Bareth, 1996^{i c g}
- Litocampa quadrisetigera Bareth, 2001^{g}
- Litocampa sollaudi (Denis, 1930)^{g}
- Litocampa tuzetae (Condé, 1948)^{g}
- Litocampa valentinei (Conde, 1949)^{i c g}

Data sources: i = ITIS, c = Catalogue of Life, g = GBIF, b = Bugguide.net
