= Anatoliacampa =

Scientific classification
- Kingdom: Animalia
- Phylum: Arthropoda
- Clade: Pancrustacea
- Class: Entognatha
- Order: Diplura
- Family: Campodeidae
- Subfamily: Plusiocampinae
- Genus: Anatoliacampa; Sendra, Tusun & Satar, 2022

Genus of bristletails

Anatoliacampa is a genus of two-pronged bristletails in the family Campodeidae. There are two described species in Anatoliacampa.

== Taxonomy ==
The genus Anatoliacampa was introduced in 2022 with Anatoliacampa diclensis as the type species. Genus name combines Anatolia and -campa suffix which is used traditionally in naming Campodeidae genera.

=== Species ===
These two species belong to the genus Anatoliacampa:

- Anatoliacampa diclensis Sendra, Tusun & Satar, 2022
- Anatoliacampa pax Sendra & Mehrafrooz, 2026
