= Edriocampa =

Scientific classification
- Domain: Eukaryota
- Kingdom: Animalia
- Phylum: Arthropoda
- Order: Diplura
- Family: Campodeidae
- Genus: Edriocampa; Silvestri, 1933

Genus of two-pronged bristletails

Edriocampa is a genus of two-pronged bristletails in the family Campodeidae.
