= Orientocampa =

Scientific classification
- Kingdom: Animalia
- Phylum: Arthropoda
- Class: Entognatha
- Order: Diplura
- Family: Campodeidae
- Subfamily: Campodeinae
- Genus: Orientocampa; Allen, 2002

Genus of two-pronged bristletails

Orientocampa is a genus of two-pronged bristletails in the family Campodeidae. There is at least one described species in Orientocampa, O. frigillis.
