= Campodeinae =

Scientific classification
- Domain: Eukaryota
- Kingdom: Animalia
- Phylum: Arthropoda
- Order: Diplura
- Family: Campodeidae
- Subfamily: Campodeinae

Subfamily of two-pronged bristletails

Campodeinae is a subfamily of two-pronged bristletails in the family Campodeidae. There are about 12 genera and at least 70 described species in Campodeinae.

== Genera ==
These 12 genera belong to the subfamily Campodeinae:

- Campodea Westwood, 1842^{i c g}
- Clivocampa Allen, 1994^{i c g}
- Condeicampa Ferguson, 1996^{i c g}
- Eumesocampa Silvestri, 1933^{i c g}
- Haplocampa Silvestri, 1912^{i c g b}
- Litocampa Silvestri, 1933^{i c g}
- Meiocampa Silvestri, 1933^{i c g}
- Metriocampa Silvestri, 1911^{i c g}
- Orientocampa Allen, 2002^{i c g}
- Parallocampa Silvestri, 1933^{i c g}
- Podocampa Silvestri, 1932^{i c g}
- Tricampa Silvestri, 1933^{i c g}

Data sources: i = ITIS, c = Catalogue of Life, g = GBIF, b = Bugguide.net
