= Clivocampa =

Scientific classification
- Domain: Eukaryota
- Kingdom: Animalia
- Phylum: Arthropoda
- Order: Diplura
- Family: Campodeidae
- Subfamily: Campodeinae
- Genus: Clivocampa; Allen, 1994

Genus of two-pronged bristletails

Clivocampa is a genus of two-pronged bristletails in the family Campodeidae. There is at least one described species in Clivocampa, C. solus.
