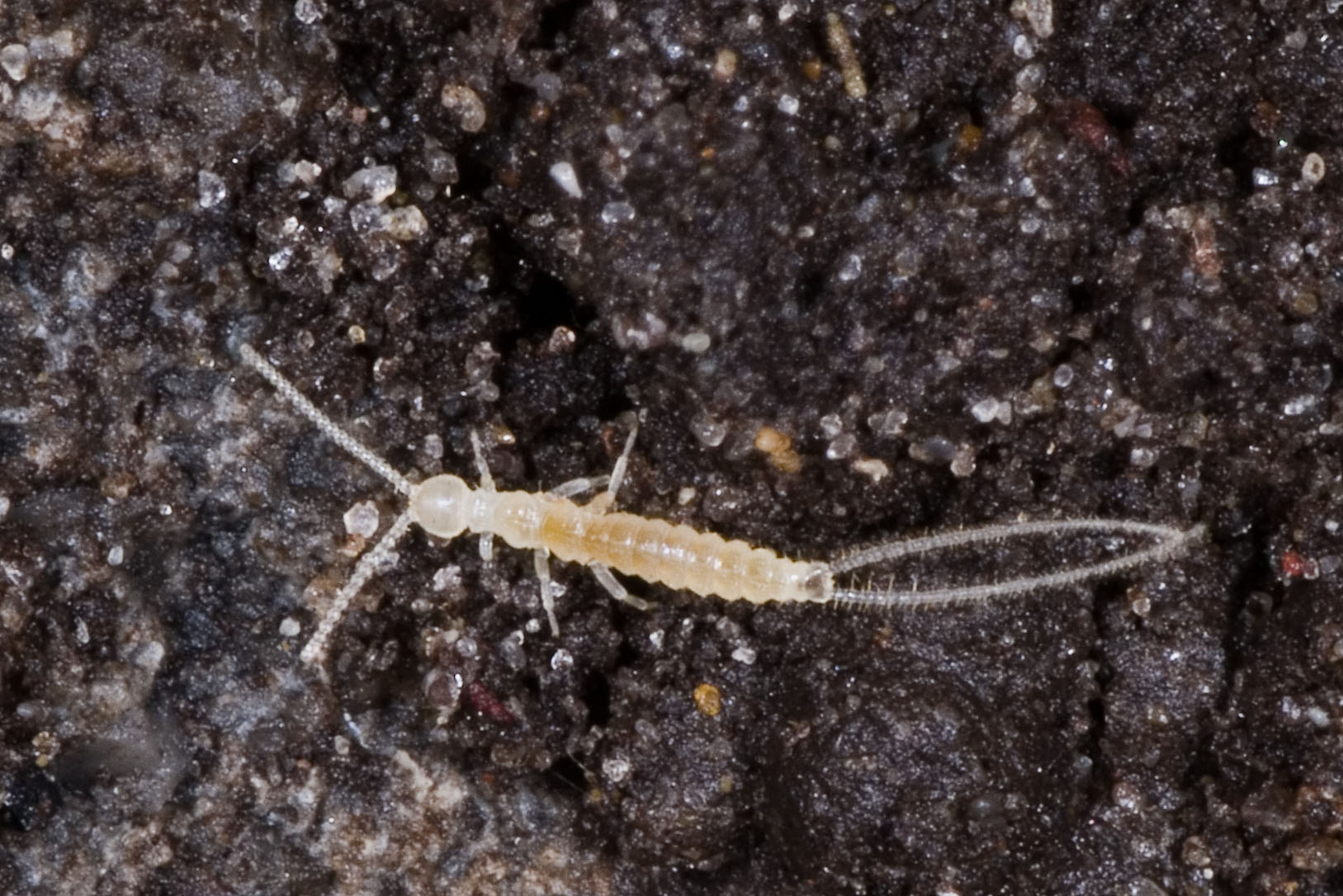

Scientific classification
- Kingdom: Animalia
- Phylum: Arthropoda
- Class: Entognatha
- Order: Diplura
- Family: Campodeidae
- Genus: Campodea
- Species: C. staphylinus

Binomial name
- Campodea staphylinus Westwood, 1852

= Campodea staphylinus =

Species of two-pronged bristletail

Campodea staphylinus is a species of two-pronged bristletail in the family Campodeidae.

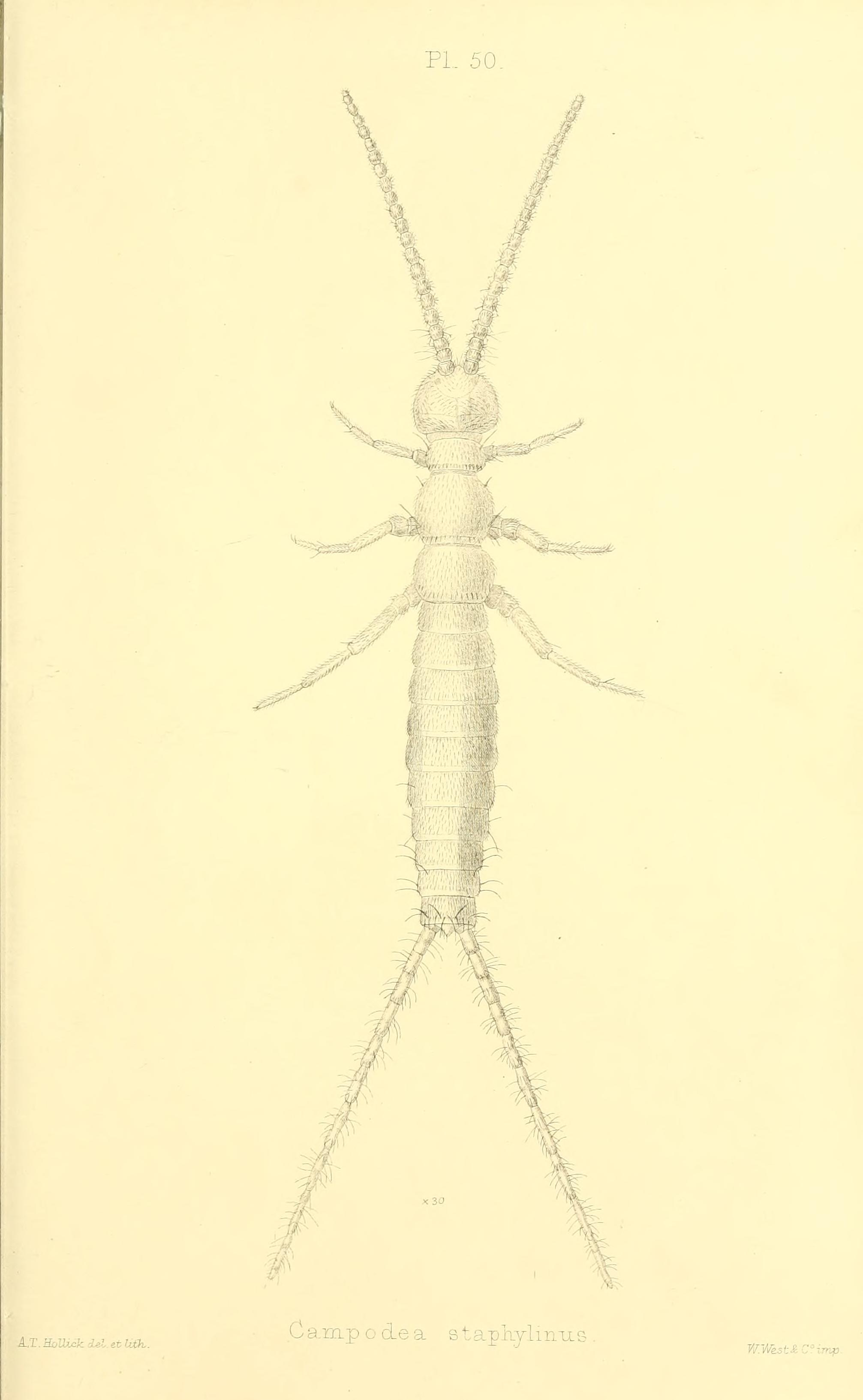
Illustration of C. staphylinus.
