= Isoentomon sylvicola =

Scientific classification
- Domain: Eukaryota
- Kingdom: Animalia
- Phylum: Arthropoda
- Order: Protura
- Family: Eosentomidae
- Genus: Isoentomon
- Species: I. sylvicola

Binomial name
- Isoentomon sylvicola Tuxen, 1975

Species of insect-like animal

Isoentomon sylvicola is a species of proturan in the family Eosentomidae. It is found in South America.
