= Paracondeellum =

Scientific classification
- Kingdom: Animalia
- Phylum: Arthropoda
- Class: Entognatha
- Order: Protura
- Family: Protentomidae
- Genus: Paracondeellum; Yin, Xie & Zhang, 1994

Genus of insect-like animals

Paracondeellum is a genus of proturans in the family Protentomidae, found in China.

== Species ==
- Paracondeellum dukouense Tang & Yin, 1988
