= Eutrichocampa =

Scientific classification
- Domain: Eukaryota
- Kingdom: Animalia
- Phylum: Arthropoda
- Order: Diplura
- Family: Campodeidae
- Genus: Eutrichocampa; Silvestri, 1902

Genus of two-pronged bristletails

Eutrichocampa is a genus of two-pronged bristletails in the family Campodeidae. There are about six described species in Eutrichocampa.

== Species ==
These six species belong to the genus Eutrichocampa:

- Eutrichocampa aegea Silvestri, 1932^{g}
- Eutrichocampa collina Ionescu, 1955^{g}
- Eutrichocampa helvetica Wygodzinski, 1941^{g}
- Eutrichocampa hispanica Silvestri, 1932^{g}
- Eutrichocampa remyi Conde, 1947^{g}
- Eutrichocampa thamugadensis Condé, 1948^{g}

Data sources: i = ITIS, c = Catalogue of Life, g = GBIF, b = Bugguide.net
