= Metriocampa =

Scientific classification
- Domain: Eukaryota
- Kingdom: Animalia
- Phylum: Arthropoda
- Order: Diplura
- Family: Campodeidae
- Subfamily: Campodeinae
- Genus: Metriocampa; Silvestri, 1911

Genus of two-pronged bristletails

Metriocampa is a genus of two-pronged bristletails in the family Campodeidae. There are about six described species in Metriocampa.

== Species ==
These six species belong to the genus Metriocampa:

- Metriocampa allocerca Conde and Geeraert, 1962^{i c g}
- Metriocampa aspinosa Allen, 2002^{i c g}
- Metriocampa hatchi Silvestri, 1933^{i c g}
- Metriocampa packardi Silvestri, 1912^{i c g}
- Metriocampa petrunkevitchi Silvestri, 1933^{i c g}
- Metriocampa vandykei Silvestri, 1933^{i c g}

Data sources: i = ITIS, c = Catalogue of Life, g = GBIF, b = Bugguide.net
