= Haplocampa =

Scientific classification
- Domain: Eukaryota
- Kingdom: Animalia
- Phylum: Arthropoda
- Order: Diplura
- Family: Campodeidae
- Subfamily: Campodeinae
- Genus: Haplocampa; Silvestri, 1912

Genus of two-pronged bristletails

Haplocampa is a genus of two-pronged bristletails in the family Campodeidae. There are at least four described species in Haplocampa.

== Species ==
- Haplocampa chapmani Silvestri, 1933
- Haplocampa drakei Silvestri, 1933
- Haplocampa rugglesi Silvestri, 1933
- Haplocampa wagnelli Sendra, 2019
- Haplocampa wheeleri Silvestri, 1912
