= Meiocampa =

Scientific classification
- Domain: Eukaryota
- Kingdom: Animalia
- Phylum: Arthropoda
- Order: Diplura
- Family: Campodeidae
- Subfamily: Campodeinae
- Genus: Meiocampa; Silvestri, 1933

Genus of two-pronged bristletails

Meiocampa is a genus of two-pronged bristletails in the family Campodeidae. There are about five described species in Meiocampa.

== Species ==
These five species belong to the genus Meiocampa:

- Meiocampa arizonica Bareth and Conde, 1958^{i c g}
- Meiocampa hermsi Silvestri, 1933^{i c g}
- Meiocampa mickeli Silvestri, 1933^{i c g}
- Meiocampa newcomeri Silvestri, 1933^{i c g}
- Meiocampa wilsoni (Silvestri, 1912)^{i c g}

Data sources: i = ITIS, c = Catalogue of Life, g = GBIF, b = Bugguide.net
