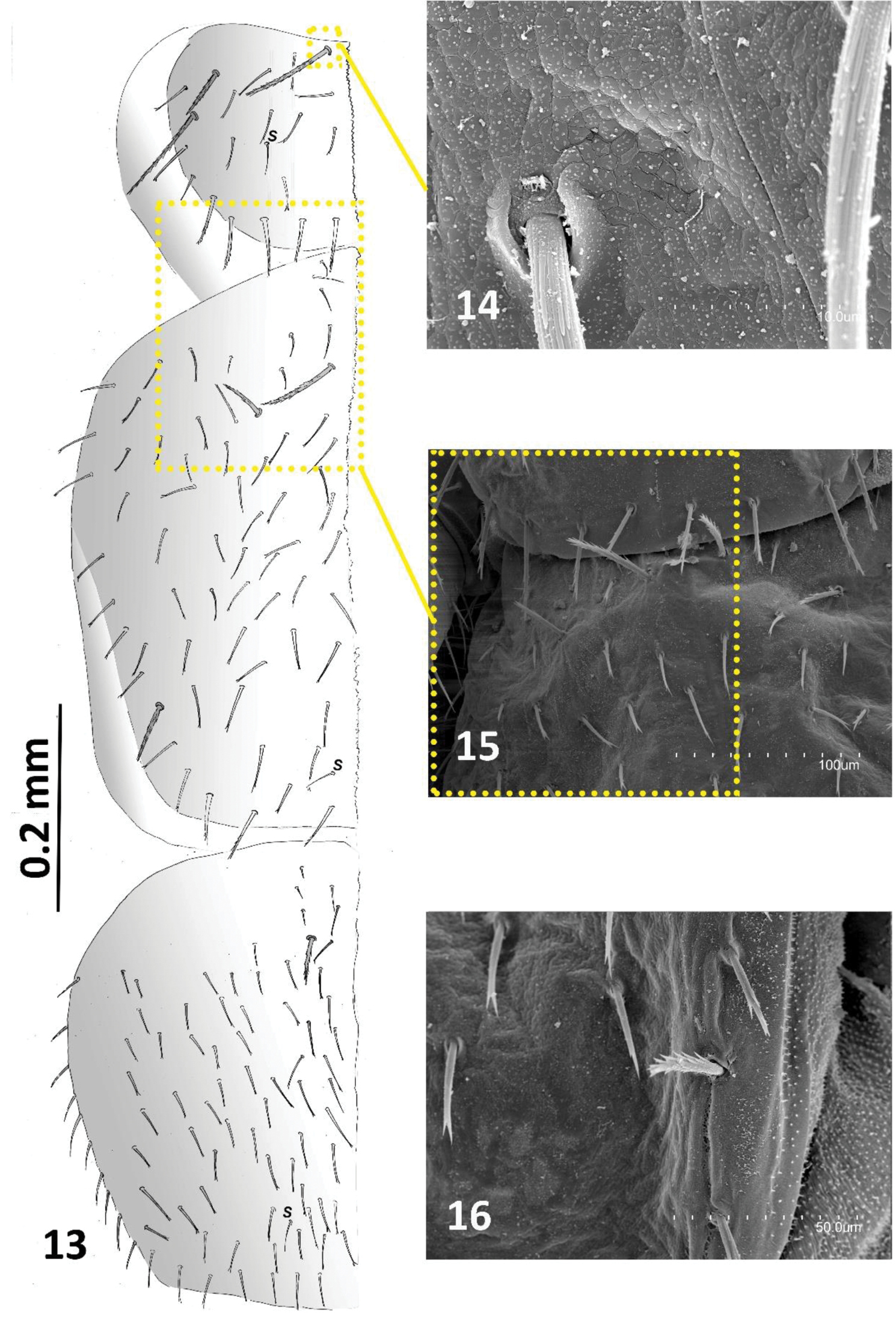
- Figures 13–16; Remycampa herbanica sp. nov. 13 Pro-, meso- and metanotum of holotype, left side 14 detail of pronotum with medial anterior macrosetae 15 left posterior portion of pronotum and left anterior anterior portion of mesonotum 16 right posterior portion of mesonotum with lateral posterior macrosetae.

Scientific classification
- Kingdom: Animalia
- Phylum: Arthropoda
- Clade: Pancrustacea
- Class: Entognatha
- Order: Diplura
- Family: Campodeidae
- Genus: Remycampa; Conde, 1952

= Remycampa =

Genus of two-pronged bristletails

Remycampa is a genus of two-pronged bristletails in the family Campodeidae.
