= Isoentomon serinus =

Scientific classification
- Domain: Eukaryota
- Kingdom: Animalia
- Phylum: Arthropoda
- Order: Protura
- Family: Eosentomidae
- Genus: Isoentomon
- Species: I. serinus

Binomial name
- Isoentomon serinus Szeptycki, 2004

Species of insect-like animal

Isoentomon serinus is a species of proturan in the family Eosentomidae. It is found in Africa and South America.
