= Podocampa =

Scientific classification
- Domain: Eukaryota
- Kingdom: Animalia
- Phylum: Arthropoda
- Order: Diplura
- Family: Campodeidae
- Subfamily: Campodeinae
- Genus: Podocampa; Silvestri, 1932

Genus of two-pronged bristletails

Podocampa is a genus of two-pronged bristletails in the family Campodeidae. There are about 18 described species in Podocampa.

== Species ==
These 18 species belong to the genus Podocampa:

- Podocampa bottimeri Conde and Geeraert, 1962^{i c g}
- Podocampa brolemanni Denis, 1932^{g}
- Podocampa cardini Silvestri, 1932^{g}
- Podocampa ceballosi Silvestri, 1932^{g}
- Podocampa cerrutii Conde, 1975^{g}
- Podocampa confinis Conde and Geeraert, 1962^{i c g}
- Podocampa fragiliformis Conde, 1954^{g}
- Podocampa fragiloides Silvestri, 1932^{g}
- Podocampa iglesiasi Silvestri, 1932^{g}
- Podocampa inveterata Allen, 1993^{i c g}
- Podocampa jeanneli Condé, 1947^{g}
- Podocampa jorgei Wygodzinski, 1944^{g}
- Podocampa labeosa Conde and Geeraert, 1962^{i c g}
- Podocampa moroderi Silvestri, 1932^{g}
- Podocampa seabrai Wygodzinski, 1944^{g}
- Podocampa simonini Conde, 1956^{g}
- Podocampa spenceri (Silvestri, 1933)^{i c g}
- Podocampa vicina Conde and Geeraert, 1962^{i c g}

Data sources: i = ITIS, c = Catalogue of Life, g = GBIF, b = Bugguide.net
