= Isoentomon pumilio =

Scientific classification
- Domain: Eukaryota
- Kingdom: Animalia
- Phylum: Arthropoda
- Order: Protura
- Family: Eosentomidae
- Genus: Isoentomon
- Species: I. pumilio

Binomial name
- Isoentomon pumilio (Bonet, 1950)

Species of insect-like animal

Isoentomon pumilio is a species of proturan in the family Eosentomidae. It is found in Central America.
