= Condeellum =

Scientific classification
- Domain: Eukaryota
- Kingdom: Animalia
- Phylum: Arthropoda
- Order: Protura
- Family: Protentomidae
- Genus: Condeellum; Tuxen, 1963

Genus of insect-like animals

Condeellum is a genus of proturans in the family Protentomidae, found in Subtropical China, Pacific Islands, Tropical Asia, and the island of Réunion.

== Species ==
- Condeellum crucis Tuxen & Imadaté, 1975
- Condeellum ishiianum Imadaté, 1965
- Condeellum jinghongense Tuxen & Yin, 1982
- Condeellum regale (Condé, 1958)
