= Bruno Condé =

- Born: Bruno Nicolas Victor Condé; 5 March 1920; Nancy, France
- Died: 11 February 2004 (aged 83); Nancy, France
- Known for: Research on Diplura, Protura, Palpigradi, millipedes, and the European wildcat
- Scientific career
- Fields: Speleology, zoology
- Academic advisors: Paul Remy

Bruno Condé (5 March 1920 – 11 February 2004) was a French speleologist and zoologist. He was born in Nancy, where he also died.

== Biography ==
He was the son of Marguerite Baudot and Georges Condé, a painter. He studied in Nancy and, in 1943, began his career as a botanical laboratory preparator at the Faculty of Sciences of Nancy. Two years later, he became an assistant to the chair of zoology held by Paul Remy (1894–1962). He was appointed head of practical work in 1948 and, four years later, defended his thesis in natural sciences, Matériaux pour une monographie des Diploures Campodéidés. In it, he described, among other things, a new genus and two new species.

He became deputy director of the zoological museum in 1955 and director in 1960; he became a university professor in 1962.

In November 1961, he was the founding president of the Union spéléologique autonome de Nancy, a speleology club whose orientation was then firmly scientific. He was a full member of the Académie lorraine des sciences, remaining a member for 58 years. In 1972, he became an associate corresponding member of the Académie de Stanislas and received the Academy's 1976 Grand Prize for the creation of the tropical aquarium of Nancy.

He retired in 1989.

== Scientific work ==
Condé studied in particular the morphology, development, ecology, and biogeography of diplurans of the family Campodeidae, for which he established a phylogenetic classification comprising the Campodeinae, Hemicampinae, and Lepidocampinae. Condé studied cave-dwelling species and, in particular, the anatomy of Protura, very small and difficult-to-collect insects, for which he proposed a new classification. He also studied millipedes of the order Penicillata, investigating their postembryonic development, morphology, geographic distribution, and biogeography. Finally, among other groups of invertebrates, he studied Palpigradi, for which he also proposed a classification based on a new anatomical study.

In the 1960s, in connection with the research of Paul Schauenberg, he studied the biology of the European wildcat (Felis silvestris), becoming one of its principal specialists. In order to observe its behaviour, he maintained captive populations both in his laboratory and at his home on Rue de la Ravinelle (where they were allowed to roam freely), and at his parents' property at La Poste de Velaine (where they were kept in cages). His research contributed to the species' legal reclassification as a "protected" species in 1979, having previously been classified as "nuisible" (harmful).

Also an aquarist, Condé founded an aquarium society in Nancy in 1963 with other enthusiasts. The association gradually expanded until it became the Nancy Tropical Aquarium, which opened in 1971. He also founded the Revue française d'aquariologie et d'herpétologie, which disseminated scientific observations made at the aquarium.

Bruno Condé was the author of 320 publications.

He was a correspondent of the natural history museums of Paris, Washington, Geneva, and London. He was sponsored for membership of the Société zoologique de France in 1946 by Paul Remy and Jean Bourgogne (1903–1999), and later served as its president. A member of the Société zoologique de France for 58 years, Condé served on its board of directors from 1983 to 2000 and was president from 1992 to 1994.

== Taxa described ==
Bruno Condé described the following 167 species:

- Acerella remyi Condé, 1944
- Acerentomon brevisetosum Condé, 1945
- Acerentomon giganteum Condé, 1944
- Acerentulus catalanus Condé, 1951
- Acerentulus cunhai Condé, 1950
- Acerentulus exiguus Condé, 1944
- Acerentulus gisini Condé, 1952
- Acerentulus insignis Condé, 1945
- Alloproctoides remyi Marquet & Condé, 1950
- Aprosthema hyalinopterum Condé, 1934
- Berberentulus berberus Condé, 1948
- Campodea (Campodea) augens chardardi Condé, 1947
- Campodea (Campodea) blandinae Condé, 1948
- Campodea (Campodea) blandinae blandinae Condé, 1948
- Campodea (Campodea) blandinae ichnusa Condé, 1957
- Campodea (Campodea) blandinae virgolae Condé, 1948
- Campodea (Campodea) chardardi Condé, 1947
- Campodea (Campodea) chardardi cephalonica Condé, 1984
- Campodea (Campodea) chardardi chardardi Condé, 1947
- Campodea (Campodea) cyrnea Condé, 1946
- Campodea (Campodea) cyrnea alethae Condé, 1946
- Campodea (Campodea) cyrnea cyrnea Condé, 1946
- Campodea (Campodea) egena Condé, 1951
- Campodea (Campodea) epirotica Condé, 1984
- Campodea (Campodea) frascajensis Condé, 1946
- Campodea (Campodea) machadoi Condé, 1951
- Campodea (Campodea) majorica Condé, 1954
- Campodea (Campodea) majorica interjecta Condé, 1954
- Campodea (Campodea) majorica majorica Condé, 1954
- Campodea (Campodea) majorica sicula Condé, 1957
- Campodea (Campodea) monspessulana Condé, 1953
- Campodea (Campodea) oredonensis Condé, 1951
- Campodea (Campodea) patrizii Condé, 1953
- Campodea (Campodea) procera Condé, 1948
- Campodea (Campodea) pseudofragilis Condé, 1984
- Campodea (Campodea) pusilla Condé, 1956
- Campodea (Dicampa) insulana Condé, 1953
- Campodea (Dicampa) jolyi Condé, 1948
- Campodea (Dicampa) neuherzi Condé, 1996
- Campodea (Dicampa) sprovierii vardousiae Condé, 1984
- Campodea (Monocampa) denisi aequalis Condé, 1947
- Campodea (Monocampa) emeryi algira Condé, 1948
- Campodea (Monocampa) emeryi spelaea Condé, 1978
- Campodea (Monocampa) goursati Condé, 1950
- Campodea (Monocampa) hauseri Condé, 1978
- Campodea (Paurocampa) corsica Condé, 1947
- Campodea (Paurocampa) pachychaeta Condé, 1946
- Campodea (Paurocampa) pretneri Condé, 1974
- Campodea (Paurocampa) ruseki Condé, 1966
- Cestocampa balcanica Condé, 1955
- Eosentomon carolae Condé, 1947
- Eosentomon coiffaiti Condé, 1961
- Eosentomon denisi Condé, 1947
- Eosentomon mixtum Condé, 1945
- Eukoenenia austriaca peregrina Condé, 1990
- Eukoenenia bonadonai Condé, 1979
- Eukoenenia bouilloni Condé, 1980
- Eukoenenia brignolii Condé, 1979
- Eukoenenia christiani Condé, 1988
- Eukoenenia deleta Condé, 1992
- Eukoenenia draco zariquieyi Condé, 1951
- Eukoenenia gasparoi Condé, 1988
- Eukoenenia grafittii Condé & Heurtault, 1993
- Eukoenenia improvisa Condé, 1979
- Eukoenenia janetscheki Condé, 1993
- Eukoenenia juberthiei Condé, 1974
- Eukoenenia juberthiei cytheriaca Condé, 1979
- Eukoenenia juberthiei hellenica Condé, 1979
- Eukoenenia kenyana Condé, 1979
- Eukoenenia lienhardi Condé, 1989
- Eukoenenia lyrifer Condé, 1992
- Eukoenenia madeirae Strinati & Condé, 1995
- Eukoenenia maros Condé, 1992
- Eukoenenia naxos Condé, 1990
- Eukoenenia orghidani Condé & Juberthie, 1981
- Eukoenenia patrizii Condé, 1956
- Eukoenenia pauli Condé, 1979
- Eukoenenia paulinae Condé, 1994
- Eukoenenia pretneri Condé, 1977
- Eukoenenia pyrenaella Condé, 1990
- Eukoenenia remyi Condé, 1974
- Eukoenenia singhi Condé, 1989
- Eukoenenia spelaea hauseri Condé, 1974
- Eukoenenia spelaea strouhali Condé, 1972
- Eukoenenia strinatii Condé, 1977
- Eukoenenia thais Condé, 1988
- Eukoenenia zariquieyi Condé, 1951
- Eutrichocampa (Chaocampa) collina ithacesia Condé, 1984
- Eutrichocampa (Eutrichocampa) thamugadensis Condé, 1948
- Eutrichocampa (Idiocampa) remyi Condé, 1947
- Gracilentulus meridianus Condé, 1945
- Helladocampa mahnerti Condé, 1984
- Heptamelus (Pseudoheptamelus) runari Condé, 1932
- Hystrichocampa pelletieri Condé, 1948
- Isoentomon atlanticum Condé, 1947
- Koeneniodes berndi Condé, 1988
- Koeneniodes deharvengi Condé, 1981
- Koeneniodes leclerci Condé, 1981
- Leptokoenenia gerlachi Condé, 1965
- Litocampa bourgoini Condé, 1948
- Litocampa cognata Condé, 1948
- Litocampa coiffaiti Condé, 1948
- Litocampa drescoi Condé, 1949
- Litocampa espanoli Condé, 1949
- Litocampa henryi Condé, 1991
- Litocampa hubarti comani Condé, 1991
- Litocampa humilis Condé, 1948
- Litocampa paclti Condé, 1981
- Litocampa tuzetae Condé, 1948
- Lophoproctus pagesi Condé, 1982
- Maderentulus maderensis Condé, 1957
- Nosekiella danica Condé, 1947
- Oncinocampa falcifer Condé, 1982
- Oncinocampa paclti Condé, 1981
- Patrizicampa sardoa Condé, 1956
- Plusiocampa (Plusiocampa) affinis Condé, 1947
- Plusiocampa (Plusiocampa) balsani Condé, 1947
- Plusiocampa (Plusiocampa) bonadonai Condé, 1948
- Plusiocampa (Plusiocampa) bonadonai bonadonai Condé, 1948
- Plusiocampa (Plusiocampa) bonadonai lanzai Condé, 1962
- Plusiocampa (Plusiocampa) bonneti Condé, 1948
- Plusiocampa (Plusiocampa) bonneti bonneti Condé, 1948
- Plusiocampa (Plusiocampa) breuili Condé, 1955
- Plusiocampa (Plusiocampa) caprai Condé, 1950
- Plusiocampa (Plusiocampa) corcyraea abdominalis Condé, 1984
- Plusiocampa (Plusiocampa) corcyraea cyrnensis Condé, 1953
- Plusiocampa (Plusiocampa) euxina Condé, 1996
- Plusiocampa (Plusiocampa) exsulans Condé, 1947
- Plusiocampa (Plusiocampa) fagei Condé, 1954
- Plusiocampa (Plusiocampa) grandii caprai Condé, 1950
- Plusiocampa (Plusiocampa) isterina Condé, 1996
- Plusiocampa (Plusiocampa) latens Condé, 1947
- Plusiocampa (Plusiocampa) lindbergi Condé, 1956
- Plusiocampa (Plusiocampa) pouadensis fouresi Condé, 1956
- Plusiocampa (Plusiocampa) pouadensis leoni Condé, 1951
- Plusiocampa (Plusiocampa) provincialis Condé, 1949
- Plusiocampa (Plusiocampa) provincialis praedita Condé, 1949
- Plusiocampa (Plusiocampa) provincialis provincialis Condé, 1949
- Plusiocampa (Plusiocampa) romana Condé, 1954
- Plusiocampa (Plusiocampa) rybaki Condé, 1956
- Plusiocampa (Plusiocampa) schweitzeri Condé, 1947
- Plusiocampa (Stygiocampa) dalmatica Condé, 1959
- Plusiocampa (Stygiocampa) denisi Condé, 1947
- Plusiocampa (Stygiocampa) remyi Condé, 1947
- Plusiocampa glabra Condé, 1984
- Plusiocampa magdalenae Condé, 1957
- Plusiocampa sardiniana Condé, 1981
- Plusiocampa socia Condé, 1983
- Plusiocampa vandeli Condé, 1947
- Plusiocampa vedovinii Condé, 1981
- Podocampa cerrutii Condé, 1975
- Podocampa cerrutii cerrutii Condé, 1975
- Podocampa cerrutii kahmanni Condé, 1975
- Podocampa fragiliformis Condé, 1954
- Podocampa jeanneli Condé, 1947
- Podocampa simonini Condé, 1956
- Prokoenenia asiatica Condé, 1994
- Prokoenenia celebica Condé, 1994
- Prokoenenia javanica Condé, 1990
- Protentomon barandiarani Condé, 1947
- Proturentomon discretum Condé, 1961
- Proturentomon pectinatum Condé, 1948
- Proturentomon picardi Condé, 1960
- Remycampa grassei Condé, 1954
- Rhinopias eschmeyeri Condé, 1977
- Tenthredo (Elinora) vilarrubiai Condé, 1935
- Triadokoenenia millotorum Remy Condé, 1991

== Taxa named after Condé ==
The following 32 species were named condei in honour of Bruno Condé:

- Arachnid: Leptoneta condei Dresco, 1987
- Collembola: Eosentomon condei da Cunha, 1950
- Insect: Pristiphora condei Lindqvist, 1955
- Malacostraca: Oritoniscus condei Brian, 1956
- Palpigradi: Eukoenenia condei Orghidan, Georgesco & Sârbu, 1982
- Pauropoda: Allopauropus condei Remy, 1947
- Protura: Acerentomon condei Nosek & Dallai, 1982
- Protura: Acerentulus condei Nosek, 1983
- Protura: Ionescuellum condei Nosek, 1965
- Protura: Proturentomon condei Nosek, 1967
- Acanthophorides condei Borgmeier, 1928
- Alaskaentomon condei Nosek, 1981
- Amoria jamrachii amoria jamrachi condei Bail & Limpus, 2001
- Apistoloricaria condei Isbrücker & Nijssen, 1986
- Athetis condei Viette, 1963
- Barbus condei Mahnert & Géry, 1982
- Carebarella condei Borgmeier, 1937
- Cercomantispa condei Poivre, 1982
- Charax condei Géry & Knöppel, 1976
- Cirrhilabrus condei Allen & Randall, 1996
- Kenyentulus condei Prabhoo, 1975
- Litocampa condei Ferguson, 1999
- Madagascarentomon condei Nosek, 1978
- Madagascaridia condei Nosek, 1978
- Minolia condei Poppe, Tagaro & Dekker, 2006
- Mitrella condei Rolán, 2005
- Nosekiella condei Tuxen, 1955
- Pagodula condei Houart, 2003
- Remulopygus condei Demange, 1961
- Sangaris condei Melzer, 1931
- Turris condei Vera-Pelaez, Vega-Luz & Lozano-Francisco, 2000
- Xenotrechus condei Barr & Krekeler, 1967

== Bibliography ==
- Bareth, C.; Terver, D. (2004). "In Memoriam: Bruno Condé". Cymbium. 28 (3): 179.
- Bareth, C. (2007). "Notice sur Bruno Condé et son œuvre scientifique". Bulletin de la Société zoologique de France. 132 (3): 225–228. ISSN 0037-962X. "Notice sur Bruno Condé et son œuvre scientifique" (PDF). Université de Jussieu, Paris (in French).
- Geoffroy, J.-J. (2004). "Bruno Condé (1920–2004)". Muséum national d'histoire naturelle. "Bruno Condé (1920–2004)". Muséum national d'histoire naturelle (in French).
- Geoffroy, J.-J.; Bareth, C.; Terver, D. (2004). "Bruno Condé (1920–2004)". Société internationale de biospéologie (SIBIOS). "Bruno Condé (1920–2004)". SIBIOS (in French).
- d'Hondt, J.-L. (2007). "Bruno Condé et la Société zoologique de France". Bulletin de la Société zoologique de France. 132 (3): 229–232. ISSN 0037-962X. "Bruno Condé et la Société zoologique de France" (PDF). Université de Jussieu, Paris (in French).
- Nguyen Duy-Jacquemin, M. (2007). "Les apports de Bruno Condé à la myriapodologie". Bulletin de la Société zoologique de France. 132 (3): 233–241. ISSN 0037-962X. "Les apports de Bruno Condé à la myriapodologie" (PDF). Université de Jussieu, Paris (in French).
