= Protentomidae =

Scientific classification
- Domain: Eukaryota
- Kingdom: Animalia
- Phylum: Arthropoda
- Order: Protura
- Family: Protentomidae; Mills, 1932

Family of insect-like animals

The Protentomidae are a family of hexapods in the order Protura.

== Genera ==
- Condeellum Tuxen, 1963
- Hinomotentomon Imadaté, 1974
- Neocondeellum Tuxen & Yin, 1982
- Paracondeellum Yin, Xie & Zhang, 1994
- Protentomon Ewing, 1921
- Proturentomon Silvestri, 1909
