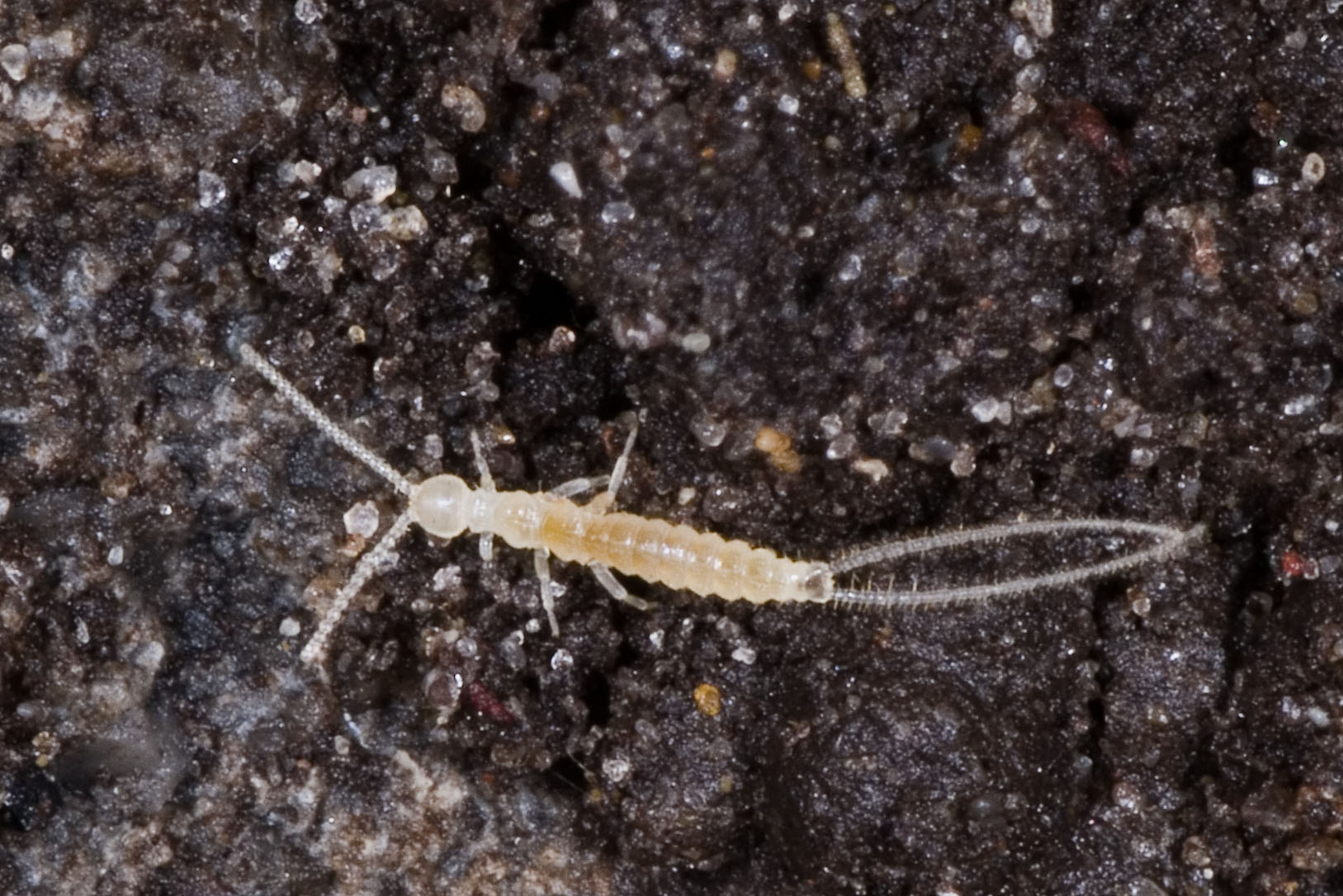
- Campodea staphylinus

Scientific classification
- Kingdom: Animalia
- Phylum: Arthropoda
- Class: Entognatha
- Order: Diplura
- Family: Campodeidae
- Subfamily: Campodeinae
- Genus: Campodea; Westwood, 1842

Species
- See text

= Campodea =

Genus of two-pronged bristletails

Campodea is a genus of small, white, bristle-tailed arthropods in the order Diplura. The best known species, Campodea staphylinus, has a wide distribution across much of Europe. It lives in damp places under stones, fallen trees, or in rotten wood and leaves. Although blind, it immediately crawls away on exposure to the light into the nearest crevice or other sheltered spot, feeling the way with its antennae. There are at least 130 described species in Campodea.

== See also ==
- List of Campodea species
