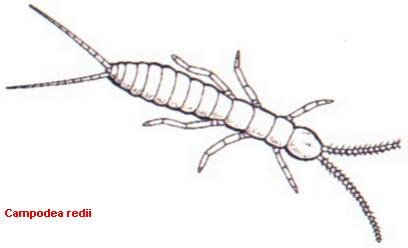
- Campodea redii

Scientific classification
- Kingdom: Animalia
- Phylum: Arthropoda
- Clade: Pancrustacea
- Class: Entognatha
- Order: Diplura
- Superfamily: Campodeoidea
- Family: Campodeidae; Lubbock, 1873

= Campodeidae =

Family of two-pronged bristletails

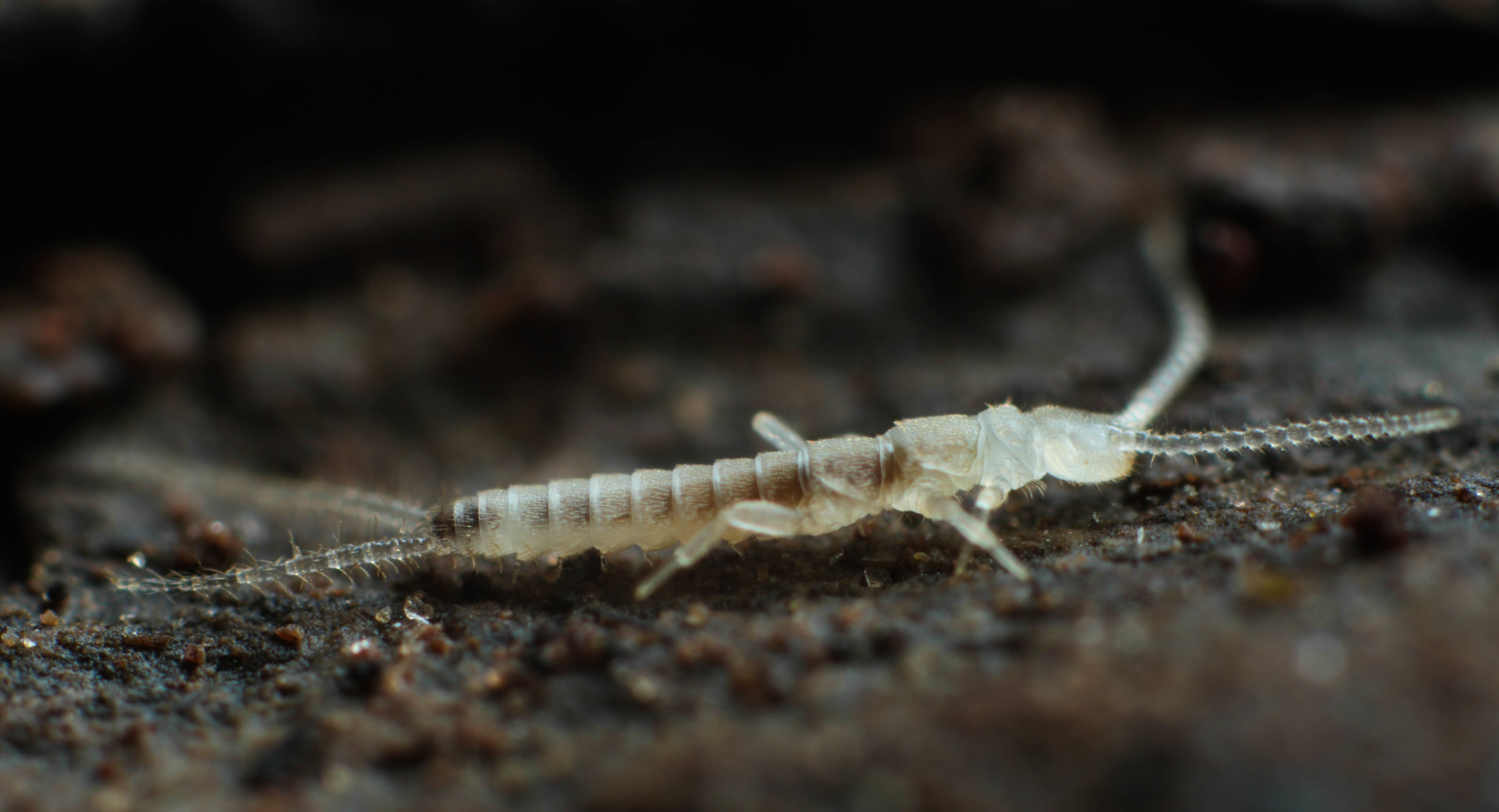
A dipluran of the family Campodeidae

The Campodeidae are a family of hexapods belonging to the order Diplura. These pale, eyeless hexapods, the largest of which grow to around 12 mm in length, can be recognised by the two long, many-segmented cerci at the end of the abdomen. Abdominal spiracles are absent.

There are at least 30 genera and 280 described species in Campodeidae.

== Genera ==
These 30 genera belong to the family Campodeidae:

- Anatoliacampa Sendra, Tusun & Satar, 2022^{c}
- Campodea Westwood, 1842^{i c g}
- Campodella Silvestri, 1913^{g}
- Cestocampa Conde, 1955^{g}
- Clivocampa Allen, 1994^{i c g}
- Condeicampa Ferguson, 1996^{i c g}
- Edriocampa Silvestri, 1933^{g}
- Eumesocampa Silvestri, 1933^{i c g}
- Eutrichocampa Silvestri, 1902^{g}
- Haplocampa Silvestri, 1912^{i c g b}
- Helladocampa Conde, 1984^{g}
- Hemicampa Silvestri, 1911^{i c g}
- Hystrichocampa Conde, 1948^{g}
- Juxtlacampa Wygodzinsky, 1944^{g}
- Lepidocampa Oudemans, 1890^{i c g}
- Libanocampa Condé, 1955^{g}
- Litocampa Silvestri, 1933^{i c g}
- Meiocampa Silvestri, 1933^{i c g}
- Metriocampa Silvestri, 1911^{i c g}
- Oncinocampa Conde, 1982^{g}
- Onychocampodea Pierce, 1951^{g}
- Orientocampa Allen, 2002^{i c g}
- Parallocampa Silvestri, 1933^{i c g}
- Paratachycampa Wygodzinsky, 1944^{g}
- Patrizicampa Conde, 1956^{g}
- Plusiocampa Silvestri, 1912^{i c g}
- Podocampa Silvestri, 1932^{i c g}
- Remycampa Conde, 1952^{g}
- Tachycampa Silvestri, 1936^{g}
- Torocampa Neuherz, 1984^{g}
- Tricampa Silvestri, 1933^{i c g}

Data sources: i = ITIS, c = Catalogue of Life, g = GBIF, b = Bugguide.net
