= Augusta Rucker =

American medical doctor, zoologist

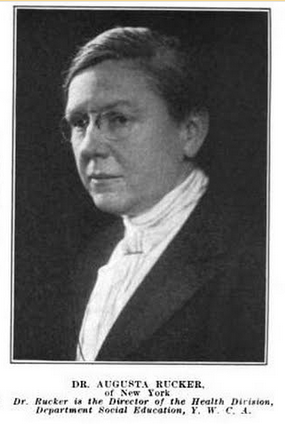
Augusta Rucker, from a 1919 publication.

Augusta Rucker (May 24, 1873 – December 26, 1963) was an American medical doctor, zoologist and public health lecturer.

== Early life ==
Augusta Rucker was born in Paris, Texas, the daughter of Samuel Brown Rucker and Martha McGaughey Rucker. She attended the University of Texas studying biology for a bachelor's degree (1896) and a masters's degree (1899), then earned a medical degree at Johns Hopkins University in 1911.

== Career ==
Augusta Rucker taught biology courses at the University of Texas for a time after she finished her master's degree. After earning her medical degree, she had a pediatric practice in Texas, and was a Fellow of the Texas Academy of Medicine. Later she took a job in New York, and from that base lectured on maternal and child health, especially preventive care such as nutrition and hygiene. "It is all one," she wrote of her global approach to her young patients' needs, "the individual is spirit; the individual is flesh; the individual is mind." She took special interest in foot health, telling audiences about the damage that shoes with high heels and pointed toes did to overall health. She also advocated for less coddling of babies, and for dress reform for adults. "The Stone Age had garments for women and children that made for better bodies than those which modern life deems essential," she insisted, pointing to tight shoes, belts, garters, and corsets as health hazards.

She served on the program committee of the International Conference of Women Physicians hosted by the YWCA in 1919. As director of the YWCA's Health Division, Rucker wrote Ten Talks to Girls on Health: For Club Leaders (1921).

Her zoological studies were focused on Texas invertebrates, including Oroperipatus eisenii, a species of velvet worm, and Texan palpigardes, Eukoenenia florenciae and Prokoenenia wheeleri.

== Personal life ==
Augusta Rucker died at a rest home near Hyannis, Massachusetts, aged 90 years.
