= International Conference of Women Physicians =

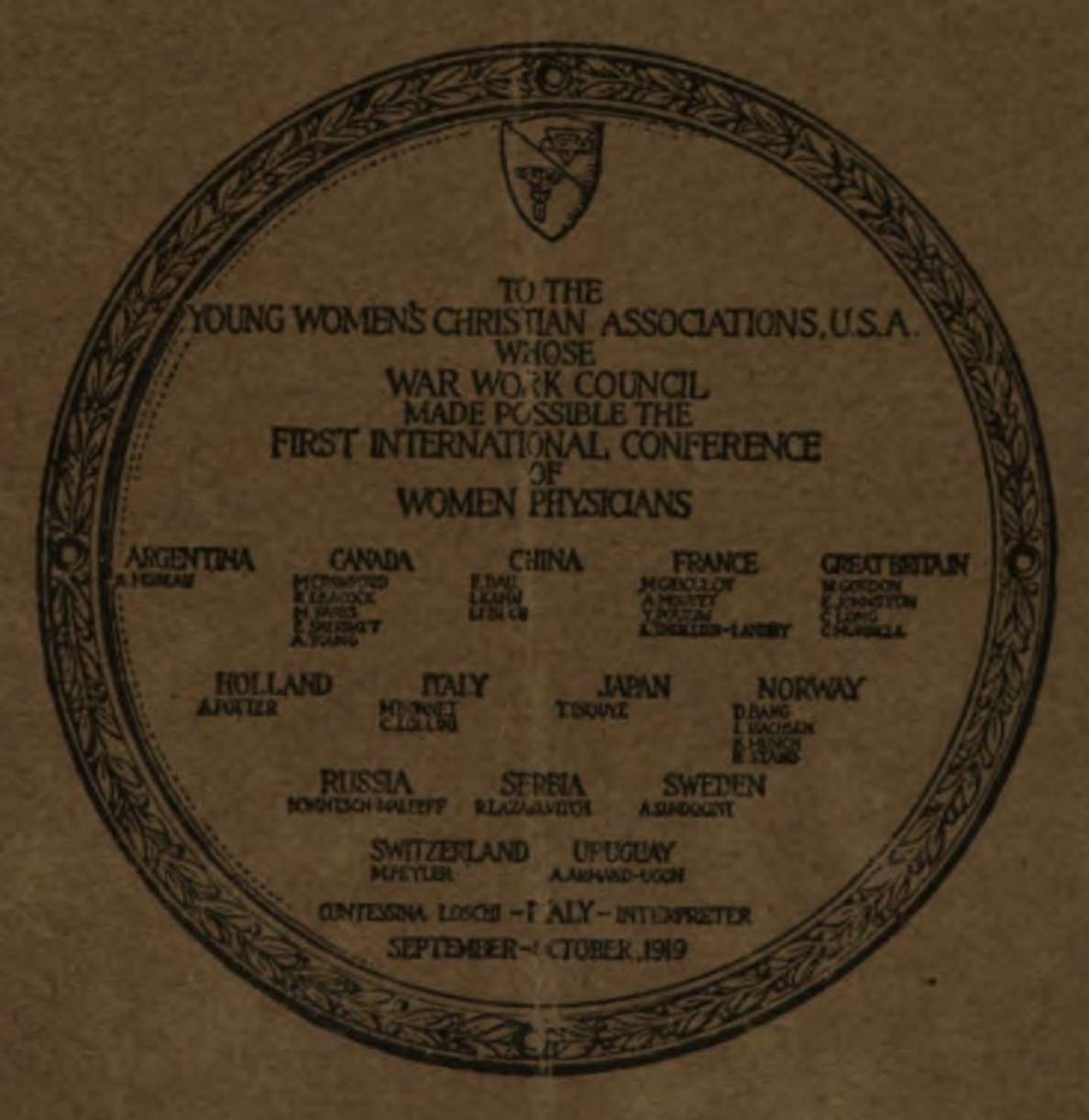
- Logo
- Date: September 15 – October 25, 1919
- Duration: Six weeks
- Venue: Waldorf Astoria
- Location: New York City, New York, U.S.
- Type: International convening of women physicians
- Cause: Recognition of the importance of health as the foundation for power and satisfaction in life
- Motive: Desire to develop closer relations with women physicians of other countries in order that the physicians of the U.S. might learn more of social conditions outside of this country and also learn how other women physicians were handling social problems in their respective countries.
- Organised by: Social Morality Committee of the War Work Council of the National Board of the YWCA (600 Lexington Avenue, Manhattan, New York City)
- Participants: 32 countries
- Outcome: Medical Women's International Association

International Conference of Women Physicians was a convening in New York City organized by the Social Morality Committee of the War Work Council of the National Board of the YWCA. Thirty-two countries were represented at the event, which took place at the Waldorf Astoria from September 15 to October 25, 1919. The conference was conducted in four languages, English, French, Italian, and German, with Contessa Maria Albertina Loschi of Rome as the official interpreter, and Anna L. Brown as the conference chair. This was the first international conference of women physicians in history.

Throughout the various discussions, there could be distinguished three groups of women, with three differing trends of thought. There were representatives of those pioneer women who years ago faced the issues of prostitution and disease, and who could see part of their fight won, although another part of it was to be renewed under modern conditions. There were those who have helped to construct new ideals and plan out new programs for physical well-being in every line, including a healthy sex life. The third group, which was engaged in building upon the accomplishments of the first two, were chiefly concerned with discovering and analyzing the foundations of character: how much is temperament, how much environment, enquiring what are the factors in friendship, how does the mind of the child develop, and how we may fathom the meaning of what goes on in ourselves all the time, in the unconscious depths of our being.

== Location ==
The Social Morality Committee of the War Work council of the National Board of the YWCA on (600 Lexington Avenue, Manhattan, New York City) acted as host for both the international conference and subsequent national convention. Residence headquarters were located at the Waldorf Astoria.

== Background ==
The work of the Social Morality Committee of the War Work council of the National Board of the YWCA began actually in 1913, when a commission was appointed to discover whether there was some better way than had yet been found to awaken among women and girls an appreciation of their responsibility for sex irregularities and for those questions that had come to be social problems. The group planned that women physicians would somehow get together the women of the world by representation and undertake to study together the questions which were vital to women everywhere. When World War I came, there was a realization that more than one set of problems needed to be dealt with.

Vague ideas and theories about the importance of health as the foundation for power and satisfaction in life had been discussed for years, but suddenly, with the development of the war, a change took place in the public attitude. Previously accepted characteristics of women, such as delicacy, physical weakness, timidity and ignorance of the facts of life seemed trivial. Good health became an asset to every woman and hence was possible of realization as never before. The fact became increasingly evident that medical women would have a special contribution to make toward the development of the health of women and children. The time was ripe. Increasing numbers of women doctors were becoming dissatisfied with the method of waiting until the patient is sick and curing her by surgery or by drugs. They desired to consecrate their powers to a constructive program of health betterment. They had come to recognize the need for the establishment of the health and strength of women on a higher level: to recognize that women must possess greater physical stamina if they are to make an affective contribution to industry and business without injury the oncoming generation.

At various periods of the war, the women physicians in the U.S. who were lecturing to women and girls, were brought together to compare notes and gauge progress. Conferences were held for the purpose of pooling ideas on method and content of lectures and on the social conditions with which they were dealing in communities. The outcome of working closely together was a desire to develop closer relations with women physicians of other countries in order that the physicians of the U.S. might learn more of social conditions outside of this country and also learn how other women physicians were handling social problems in their respective countries. It was therefore decided to invite the women physicians of many countries to a conference which could be held in the U.S. for a period sufficiently long to enable the delegates to become personally acquainted and thoroughly familiarize themselves with the problems common to women of all countries.

The conference met in response to a conscious need on the part of the women physicians in the U.S. for free discussion of those problems that related to the maintaining and improving of health by education and other constructive means. The policy in arranging these meetings was, as defined in the beginning, definitely to consider disease only in so far as it might be a determining factor in shaping future health plans. The word, "health", was to be taken in its fullest sense as meaning the well-being of the entire personality. During the six weeks' period, questions of physical, social and moral health were discussed by women physicians from Belgium, Canada, China, Denmark, England, France, India, Italy, Japan, Norway, Scotland, South America, Sweden, Switzerland, and the United States, as well as by psychologists and moral leaders.

== Purpose ==
The general purpose of the conference was to ascertain the attitude toward health education and sex problems, together with the responsibilities related to them in the various countries and to discuss future possibilities in handling individual national problems. The varying viewpoints of divorce, marriages, prostitution, illegitimacy, handling of venereal disease, sex education and health education were to be presented as among the questions of vital interest.

== International conference (Sep 15 - Oct 25, 1919) ==
=== Program ===
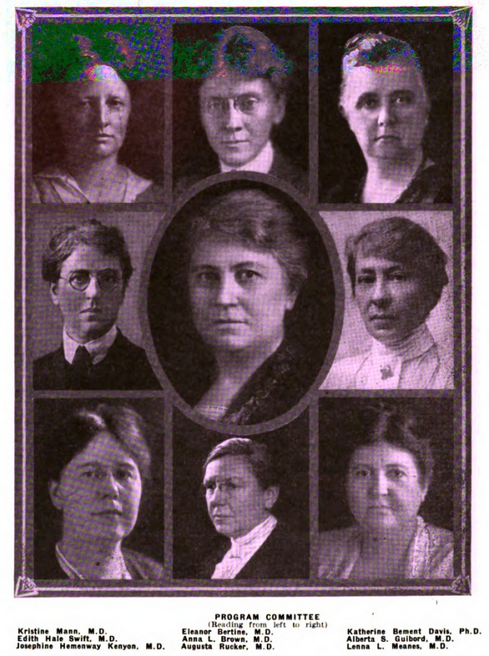
Program Committee

Many subject matters were considered: the outward conditions and habits of life, favorable and unfavorable to health; those inner conflicts which disturb the normal functioning of the body quite as effectively as unhygienic food and lack of exercise; and some of the facts of prostitution and venereal disease, inasmuch as the elimination of these blots on civilization is possible only by a more fundamental understanding of the emotional needs of men and women. This understanding will be gained by a more careful study of all manifestation of sexual expression, the undesirable as well as the desirable.

The range of subjects was wide and inclusive reach from food to psychology of the emotions. They included: "The reaction of modern civilisation on health and personality", "The problem of exercise in cities", "Dress as an index of the position of women", "Vitamins", "Community conservation of Women's strength", and "Value of work in the development of the child". Under the heading of "Industrial Health", ran "Health and industrial placement", "Health and the labor movement", followed by "Fatigue" and "The disgrace of prevalent colds". In the section, "Emotional reactions to present social conditions and their effect on health", there were "Points of difference between men and women, inherent and acquired", "Exploration of the unconscious", "The function of repression", "Conservation of the health of women in marriage", "Voluntary parenthood", "The white slave trade", "Illegitimacy", and "Sex education".

=== Committees ===
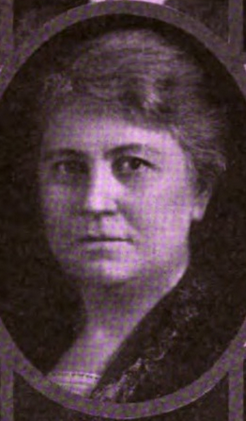
Anna L. Brown, conference chair

Anna L. Brown, M.D. was the conference chair. Her background included roles such as Director, Bureau of Social Education, National Board, YWCA; chair, Bureau of Lecturers, Section on Women's Work, War Department, 1918; chair, Program Committee, International Conference of Women Physicians. Other members of the Program Committee were: section on health, Augusta Rucker, M.D., Edith Hale Swift, M.D., Eleanor Bertina, M.D., Lenna L. Meanes, M.D., and Miss Winifred Sherwood; section on psychological aspects of the sex questions, Kristine Mann, M.D., Eleanor Bertina, M.D., Dr. Mabel Fernald, Josephine Hemenway Kenyon, M.D., and Miss Susanne R. Barns; section on legislative measures, Katherine Bement Davis, Ph.D., Dr. Alberta S. Guibord, Dr. Anna P. Bingham, and Dr. Edith Hale Swift.

The committee on relationships included Dr. Anna L. Brown, Dr. Josephine Hemenway Kenyon, Dr. Sarah Sweet Windsor, Miss Eliza Butler, Miss Caroline Colvin, and Miss Alice B. Curtis; social events, Miss Eliza Butler; correspondence, Miss Esse V. Hathaway; publicity, Miss Florence Nye; and Miss Jane Thompson was the business manager.

=== Resolutions ===
Several resolutions were passed with topics that included: General health, The health of women and children, Health in industry, Sex education, Mental and emotional health, Illegitimacy, and Monogamous marriage.

RESOLUTIONS ADOPTED BY THE INTERNATIONAL CONFERENCE OF WOMEN PHYSICIANS

This First International Conference of Medical Women desires to place on record the following resolutions:
That in the future positive health education should form an important part of the work of physicians in that it is the essential means for the prevention of illness and the establishment of a new attitude toward health .

RESOLUTIONS SPECIALLY CONCERNING WOMEN AND CHILDREN

1. Whereas, Exercise is necessary to good health, particularly under modern conditions of life, resolved,

(a) That communities be urged to supply easily accessible facilities for such exercise, namely, public gymnasia, swimming pools, recreation and health centers .
(b) That women be stimulated through health education to make full use of these opportunities .

2. That women be urged to adopt fashions of dress consistent with freedom of movement, physical development and fitness for the wearer's particular occupation .

(a) Young girls should be dissuaded from wearing corsets .
(b) Boots and shoes should be selected chiefly with a view to conforming to the natural form of the foot, and the manufacture of such shoes should be definitely encouraged.

3. Whereas, Menstruation is a physiological function,

(a) Women should be taught not to consider it as a necessary ailment, but to regard any significant deviation from comfort as an abnormal. condition which should be corrected
(b) Women should be educated to understand that systematic physical exercise and an uninterrupted routine of life have a beneficial effect upon this function .

4. Whereas, The physical integrity of the race is dependent upon a healthy maternity ,

(a) Women should be educated to recognize the importance of following during pregnancy a routine of life based on modern medical knowledge .
(b) Society should be urged to assure good hygienic conditions to every pregnant and nursing woman .
(c) Women should be insured for maternity

GENERAL RESOLUTIONS

1. Whereas, It is of great importance to all nations that their citizens should always be at a maximum of their physical power, we advocate that-

(a) Periodic regular physical examination of infants and children, up to the school - leaving age, be made, and means be taken to make it possible for the child to obtain whatever treatment is recommended .
(b) That adults also be encouraged similarly to present themselves for such regular periodic examination .
(c) That people be encouraged specially to present themselves for such examination before marriage .

2. Whereas, Appetizing, nutritious food, well cooked, is necessary for health, again we advocate that-

(a) People should be instructed in food values and encouraged to arrange their diet wisely, and especially that fresh food, such as milk, leafy vegetables and fruits, should be recommended as a necessary part of the regular dietary.
(b) The authorities should be urged to provide opportunity to obtain the same at reasonable rates and under sanitary supervision .

3. Methods of vocational guidance should be developed in order to help the individual to find the work suited to his or her capacity, strength or taste .
4. Whereas, Many diseases from which workers suffer are due to the conditions under which they labor, physicians should work to have every means taken to investigate further these conditions and to remove those which are responsible for ill health .
5. Whereas, Ill health is responsible for a large proportion of destitution, all workers should be insured against accident and sickness .
6. The conference expresses its satisfaction of the fact that the League of Nations provided for an International Health Bureau .

RESOLUTIONS RELATING TO SEX EDUCATION

Whereas, sex education is necessary for all human beings in order that they may understand the complexities of their lives, as well as their duties to the social organism; and whereas, an understanding of sex is one of the most effective ways of meeting the problems of prostitution and venereal disease ,
We are of the opinion that definite sex instruction should be given in all normal schools, training schools, medical colleges and universities, in order that future parents and teachers may be enabled to handle the subject wisely as it comes up in the home and in the teaching of their own subjects;
Resolved, That, while waiting for this trained leadership, we consider that it is necessary to continue sex education with the means now at our disposal, and in all social groups .
Inasmuch as mental health is fully as important as physical health, we as medical women place ourselves on record in support of a movement to make all schools and colleges responsive to the emotional and instinctive, as well as the intellectual, needs of children and young people, to the end that education may become an instrument for teaching the best social adjustments possible.
Whereas, The " double standard, " with its trail of prostitution and clandestine relationships, has brought infinite human degradation ,
Be it resolved, That we affirm our conviction that morality makes equal demands on both sexes. (Unanimous.)
Recognizing that prostitution, fostering the white slave trade and spreading venereal disease, is not a social necessity, we resolve that
The most important measure toward its abolition is sex education to a single standard of self-control .
In the conviction that regulation is unjust and is in no sense preventive of disease, we recommend that it be abolished, wherever it exists. Further, we recommend :

1. Severe punishment for the exploitation of persons for vice in any of its forms, acting equally on both sexes .
2. Early and sufficient care of subnormal individuals .
3. Establishment of accessible and free clinics for those suffering from venereal disease .
4. Education of the public to the need of early and prolonged treatment for venereal disease .
5. In all social legislation women should participate, not only on law-making, but also on all preventive, curative and law-enforcing bodies .

Believing that no child should be stigmatized because of the circumstances of its birth .
Be it resolved, That an investigation of the paternity of the illegitimate child be required .
That support be shared by the parents according to economic status of each;
That material rights be the same for the illegitimate as for the legitimate child .
Whereas, monogamous marriage seems the most desirable ideal to uphold ,
Resolved, That this conference go on record as approving those factors in education and economic conditions which make early monogamous marriage possible .

=== Foreign attendees ===
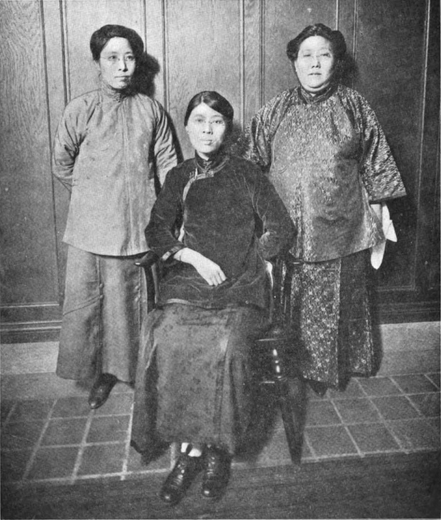
Dr. Li Bi Cu, Dr. Dau Se Zals, Dr. Ida Kahn (l-r; 1919)

There were sixty-nine registrations of U.S. women physicians and thirty-eight foreign women doctors. These included:

- Canada - Dr. Ellen Burt Sherratt, Toronto, Ontario; Dr. Helen MacMurchy, Department of Education, Toronto; Dr. Margaret Patterson, Toronto; Dr. Ann Young, Health Education Department, YWC, Toronto; Dr. Rosamond Leacock, The Calgary Clinical Laboratory, Calgary, Alberta; Dr. Mary E. Crawford, Winnipeg, Manitoba; Dr. Maude Abbott, McGill University, Montreal, Quebec
- China - Dr. Ida Kahn, Dr. Dau Se Zals, Dr. Li Bi-Cu
- Denmark - Dr. Betty Agerholm, Copenhagen; Dr. Johanne Feilberg, Copenhagen; Dr. Estrid Hein, Copenhagen
- England - Mary Gordon, Kensington, London; Dr. Christine Murrell, Hyde Park, West, London; Dr. Constance Long, London
- France - Dr. Marguerite Giboulot, Paris; Dr. Yvonne Pouzin, Nantes; Dr. Anna Moutet, Lyons; Dr. Lisbeth Thyss-Monod, Paris
- Holland - Dr. Ada Potter, Utrecht
- Italy - Dr. Angiola Borrino, Turin; Dr. Clelia Lollini, Rome
- Japan - Dr. Tomo Inouye, Japan
- Norway - Dr. Regine Stang, Christiania; Dr. Dagny Bang, Christiania; Dr. Kristine Munch, Christiania; Dr. Louise Isachsen, Christiania
- Scotland - Dr. Frances S. Johnston, Edinburgh
- Serbia - Dr. Radmila Lazarewitch, Serbian Legation, Washington, D.C.
- South America - Dr. Alice Armand Ugon, Montevideo, Uruguay; Dr. Alicia Moreau, Argentina
- Sweden - Dr. Gerda Kjellberg Romanus, Stockholm; Dr. Alma Sundquist, Stockholm
- Switzerland - Dr. Minna Tobler-Christinger, Zurich; Dr. Marie Feyler, Lausanne; Dr. Natalie Wintsch-Maleeff, Lausanne; Dr. Frieda Ottiker, Berne; Dr. Harriet Jane Parrell, Basle

== National convention of women's organizations (Oct 17-24, 1919) ==
During the closing days of the conference, from October 17 to October 24, a convention representing many of the leading national organizations of women of the United States was in session. Each organization was represented by two accredited delegates, but the meetings were open to several groups of women who were invited because of their expressed interest.

The presidents of fourteen organizations were asked by the YWCA to come together in New York and see what the organizations of women throughout the U.S. might do to carry out the resolutions of the International Conference of Women Physicians. These fourteen organizations met and decided to have a smaller committee of seven, which should understand the situation and bring a program of work to the delegates opening their session on its first day. This program of work was produced and then approved by the delegates of these fourteen organizations. They formed a House of Delegates, with five delegates from each one of the national organizations, the president and four others, and five members at large. This was a comprehensive group for establishing the principles of the organization. It was cooperative. It had nothing to bring as propaganda necessarily to the different organizations, but served as a means to carry out the work of the International Conference through the cooperative work of these same organizations. Under this House of Delegates was a Board of Trustees, to whom was entrusted the practical work. The Board of Trustees decided upon five technical committees: a committee upon education, health and sex. The findings of the Conference were used by them in the sex and health education.

=== Delegates ===
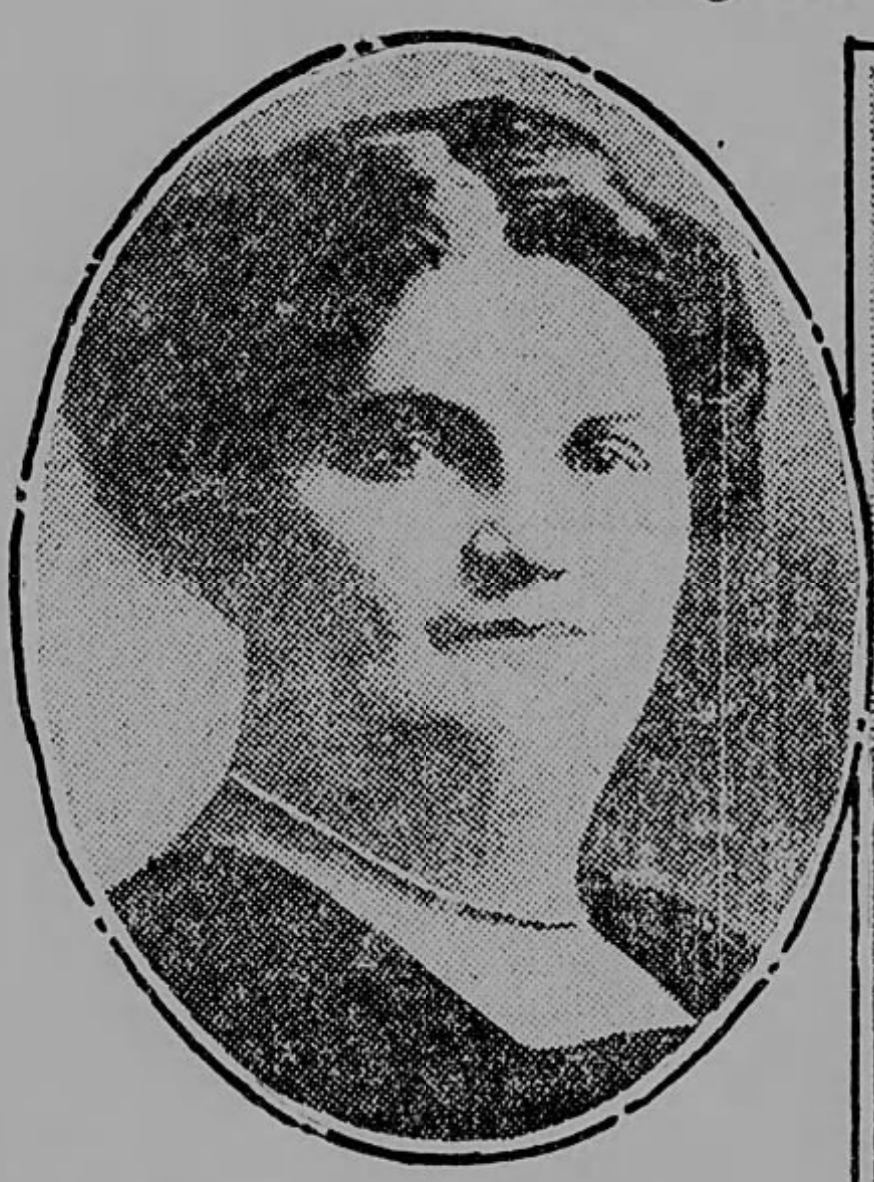
Janet Simons Harris

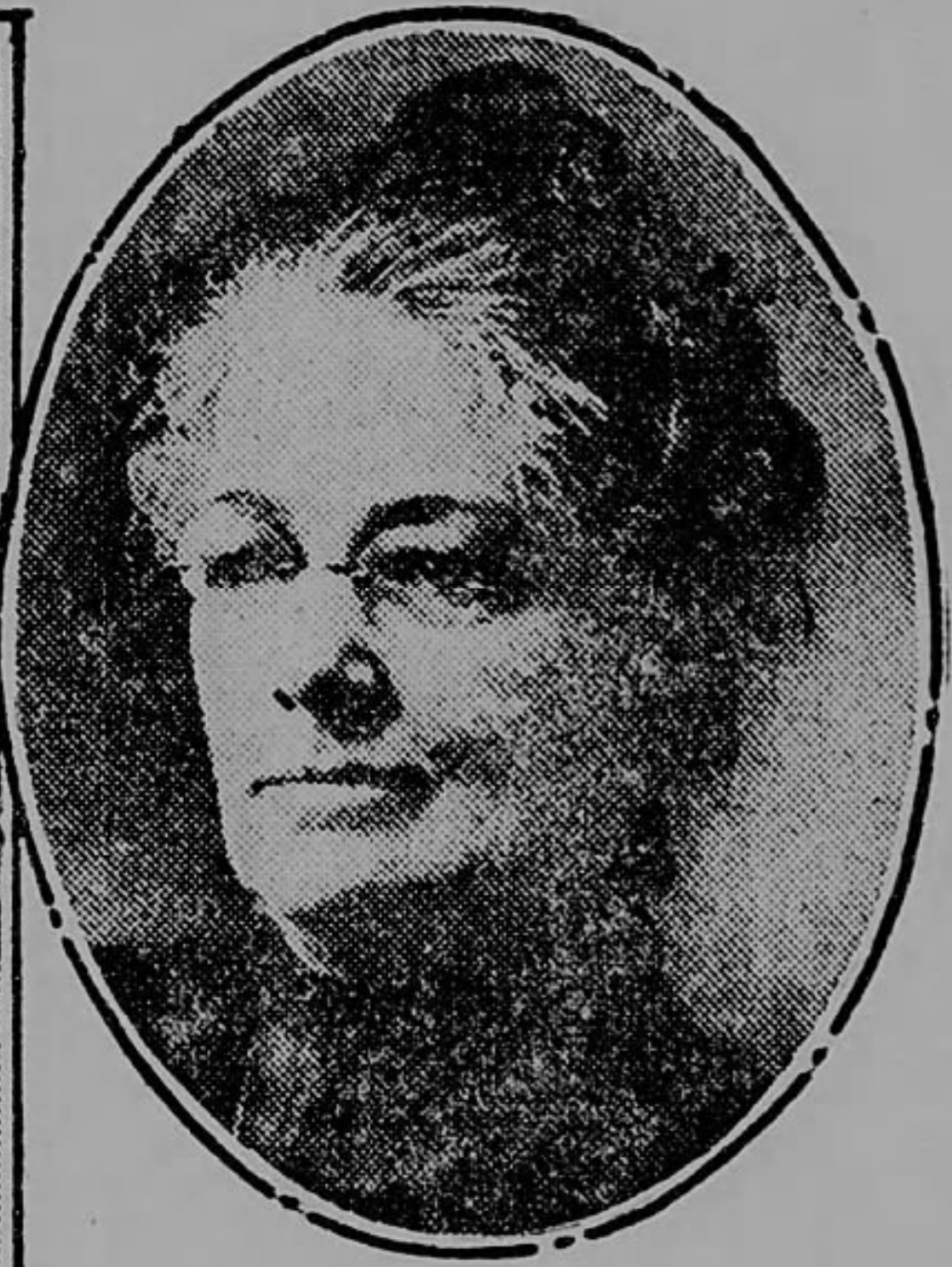
Mamie B. Henrie Codding

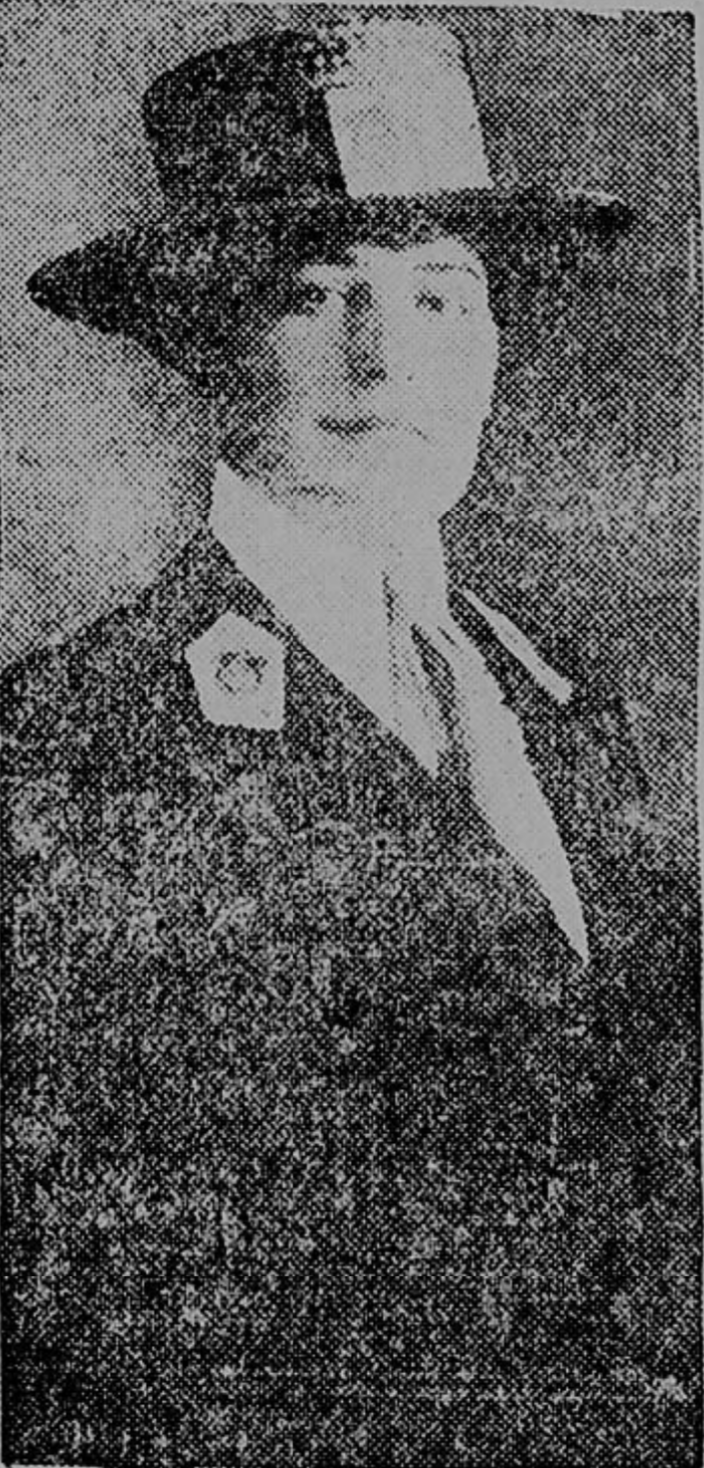
Lolita Coffin Van Rensselaer

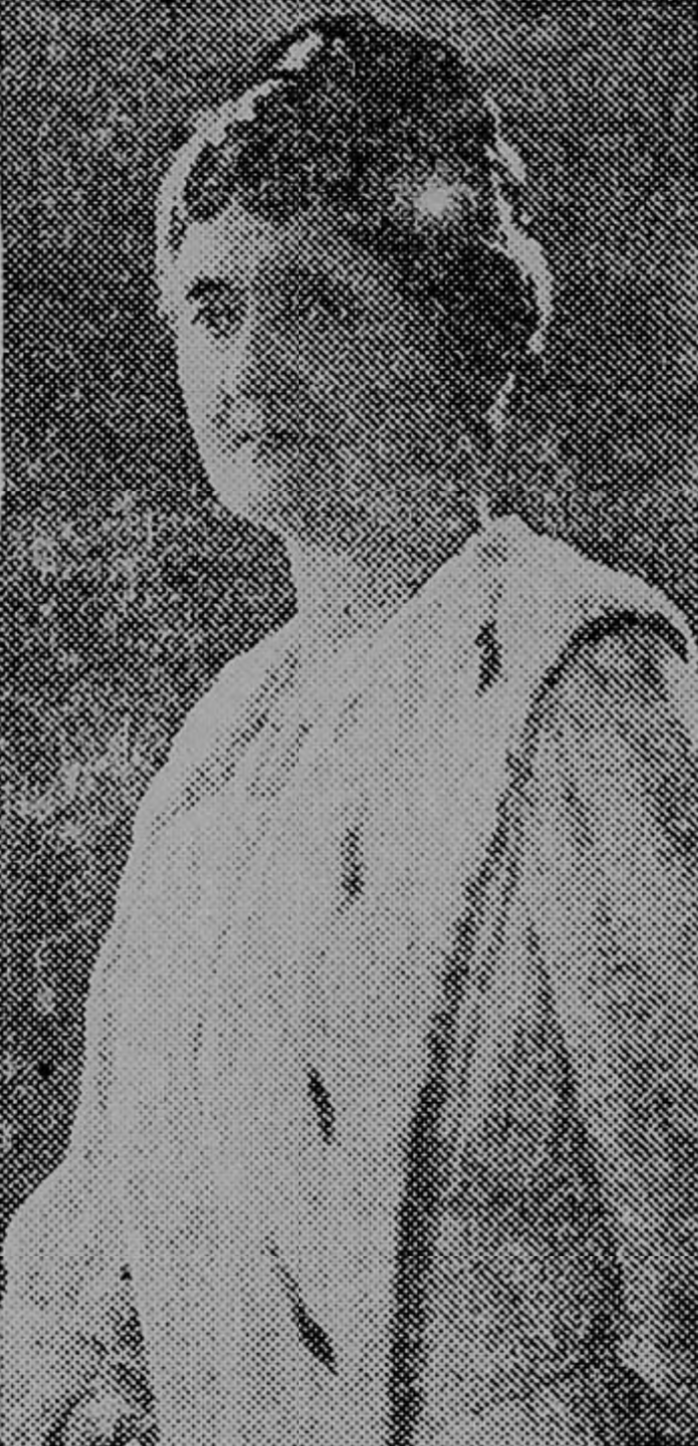
Ione Virginia Hill Cowles

The delegates to the national convention included:

- Association of Collegiate Alumnae - Gertrude S. Martin, Ph.D., Ithaca, New York; Dean Virginia C. Gildersleeve, Barnard College, New York City
- Council of Jewish Women - Janet Simons Harris (Mrs. Nathaniel E. Harris), Bradford, Pennsylvania
- General Federation of Women's Clubs - Mrs. Elmer Blair, New York City; Mrs. Woodallen Chapman, New York City
- Medical Women's National Association - Dr. Esther Lovejoy, New York City; Dr. Martha Welpton, San Diego, California
- Mother and Parent-Teacher Association - Regina Holland (Mrs. Henry O. Holland), Buffalo, New York; Mrs. J. K. Godding, Lansing, Kansas
- National American Woman Suffrage Association - Mrs. Raymond Brown, New York City
- National Council of Women - Mrs. Philip N. Moore, St. Louis, Missouri; Rev. Anna Garlin Spencer, Bristol Ferry, Rhode Island; Kristine Mann, M.D. Edith Hale Swift, M.D.; Josephine Hemenway Kenyon, M.D.
- Women's Department, National Civic Federation - Elizabeth Moorfield Storey Lovett (Mrs. Robert W. Lovett), Boston, Massachusetts; Miss Maude Wetmore, New York City; Alternate: Mrs. Coffin Van Rensselaer, New York City
- National League of Women Workers - Sarah Scheuer Ollesheimer (Mrs. Henry Ollesheimer), New York City; Miss Virginia Potter, New York City
- Women's National Trade Union League - Katharine Rolston Fisher (aka Katharine Ward Fisher; Katherine W. Fisher)
- Women's Christian Temperance Union
- National Board of the Young Women's Christian Associations - Emma Doll Bailey Speer (Mrs. Robert E. Speer)
- National Conference Deans of Women - Miss Mina Kerr, Milwaukee, Wisconsin

== Legacy ==
The outcome of the international conference and national convention was the creation of the Medical Women's International Association.

In copies of these proceedings, the YWCA included a rubber-stamped statement that "while the National Board publishes this report, it does not necessarily endorse all opinions expressed therein".

In 1920, six volumes documenting the conference preceding were published by the Woman's Press (New York City).

- Volume I: General Problems of Health (text via Hathitrust)
- Volume II: Industrial Health (text via Hathitrust)
- Volume III: The Health of the Child (text via Hathitrust)
- Volume IV: Moral Codes and Personality (text via Hathitrust)
- Volume V: Adaptation of the Individual to Life (text via Hathitrust)
- Volume VI: Conservation of the Health of Women in Marriage (text via Hathitrust)

Documents associated with the conference are held by Smith College Special Collections.

== Gallery ==
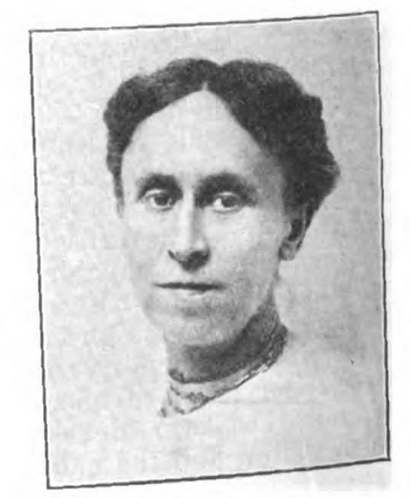
Ada Potter

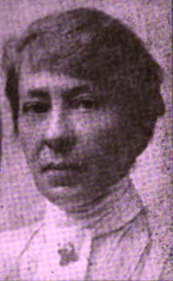
Alberta S. Guibord

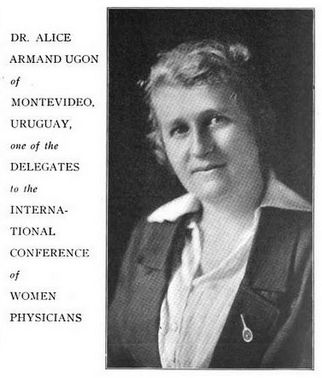
Alice Armand Ugón

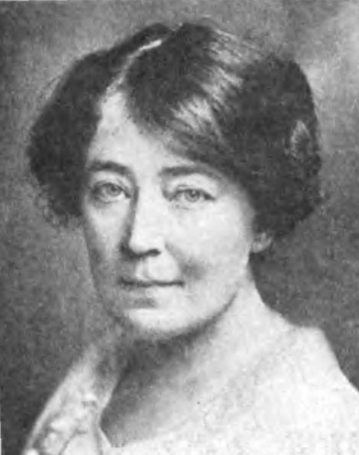
Alma Sundquist

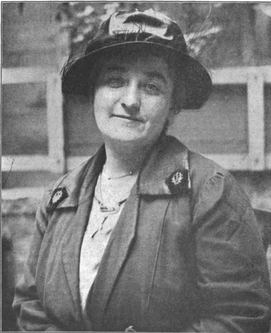
Anna Moutet

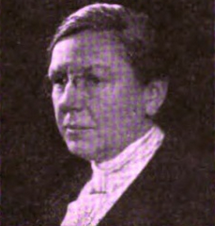
Augusta Rucker

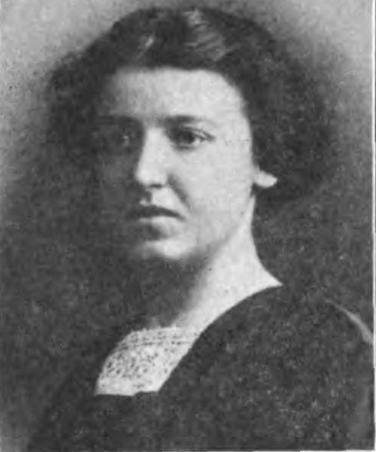
Clelia Lollini

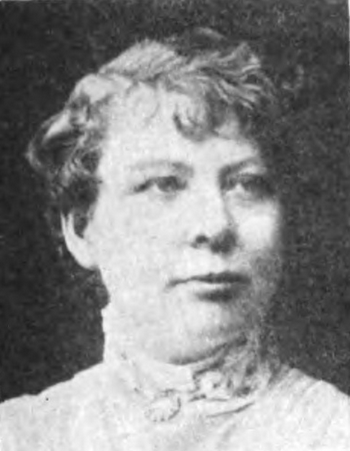
Dagny Bang

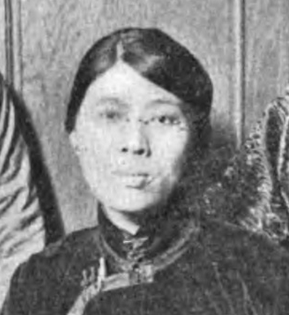
Dau Se Zals

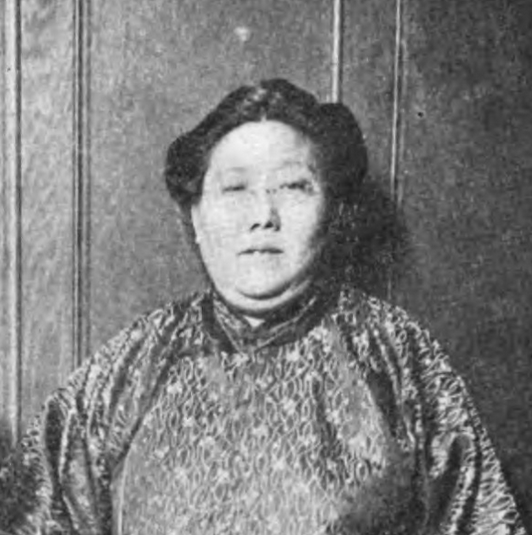
Ida Kahn

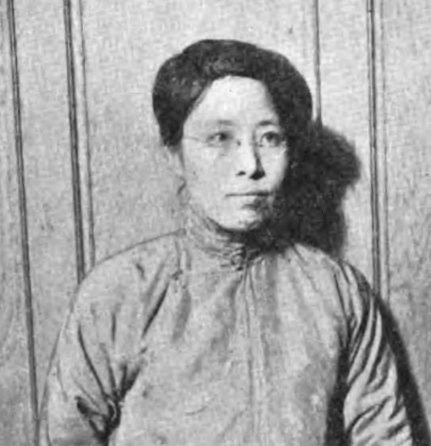
Li Bi Cu

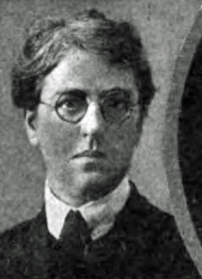
Edith Hale Swift

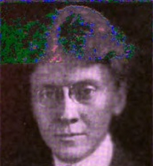
Eleanor Bertine

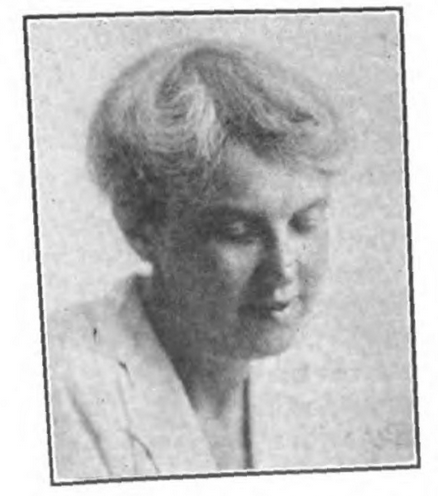
Frances Storrs Johnston

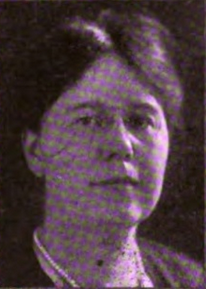
Josephine Hemenway Kenyon

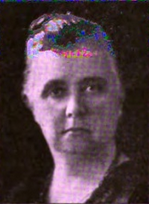
Katharine Bement Davis

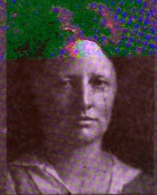
Kristine Mann

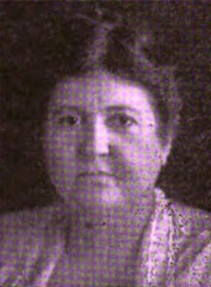
Lenna L. Meanes

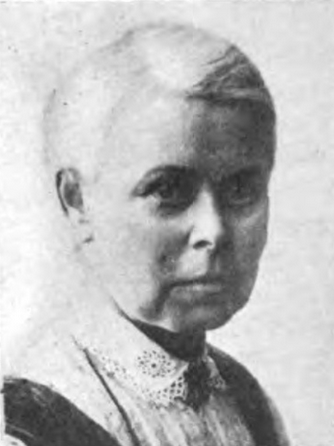
Martha Regina Stang

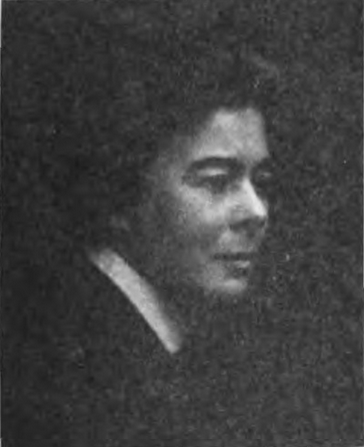
Mary Gordon

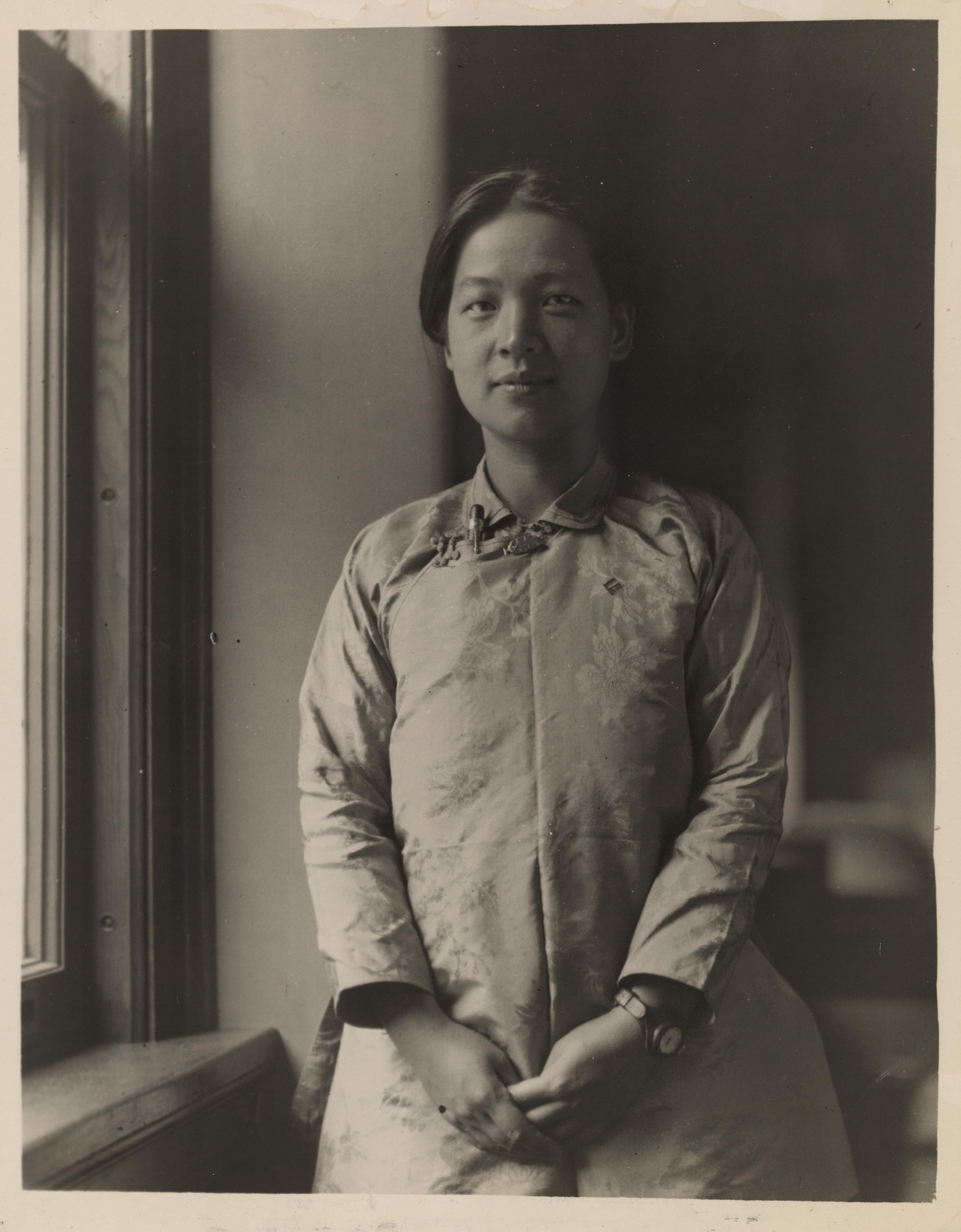
Miss Ting

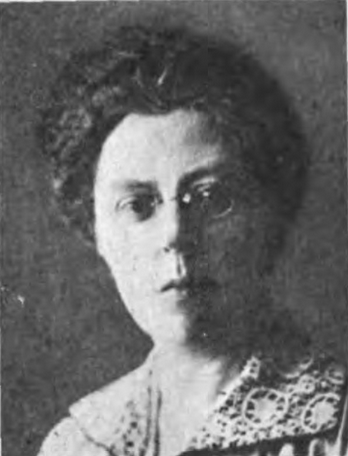
Natalie Wintsch-Maleeff

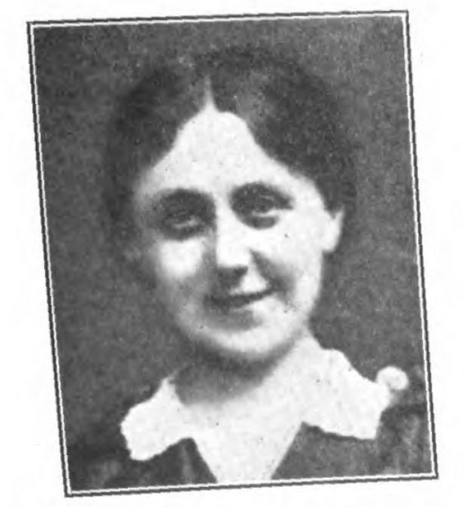
Yvonne Pouzin
