= Eukoenenia guzikae =

Scientific classification
- Kingdom: Animalia
- Phylum: Arthropoda
- Subphylum: Chelicerata
- Class: Arachnida
- Order: Palpigradi
- Family: Eukoeneniidae
- Genus: Eukoenenia
- Species: E. guzikae

Binomial name
- Eukoenenia guzikae Barranco & Harvey, 2008

Species of microwhip scorpion

Eukoenenia guzikae is a species of palpigrades, also known as microwhip scorpions, in the Eukoeneniidae family. It is endemic to Australia. It was described in 2008 by arachnologists Pablo Barranco and Mark Harvey.

== Distribution and habitat ==
The species occurs in the Murchison bioregion of Western Australia. The type locality is Sturt Meadows Station, where the male holotype was obtained from a bore.

== Behaviour ==
The palpigrades are soil-dwelling, terrestrial predators.
