= Eukoenenia mirabilis =

Scientific classification
- Kingdom: Animalia
- Phylum: Arthropoda
- Subphylum: Chelicerata
- Class: Arachnida
- Order: Palpigradi
- Family: Eukoeneniidae
- Genus: Eukoenenia
- Species: E. mirabilis

Binomial name
- Eukoenenia mirabilis (Grassi & Calandruccio, 1885)

Synonyms
- Koenenia mirabilis Grassi & Calandruccio, 1885

Species of microwhip scorpion

Eukoenenia mirabilis is a species of palpigrades, also known as microwhip scorpions, in the Eukoeneniidae family. It was described in 1885 by Italian arachnologists Giovanni Battista Grassi and Salvatore Calandruccio.

== Distribution and habitat ==
Eukoenenia mirabilis is a tramp species found in Europe and North Africa that has become introduced elsewhere. The type locality is Catania, Sicily.

== Behaviour ==
The palpigrades are soil-dwelling, terrestrial predators.
