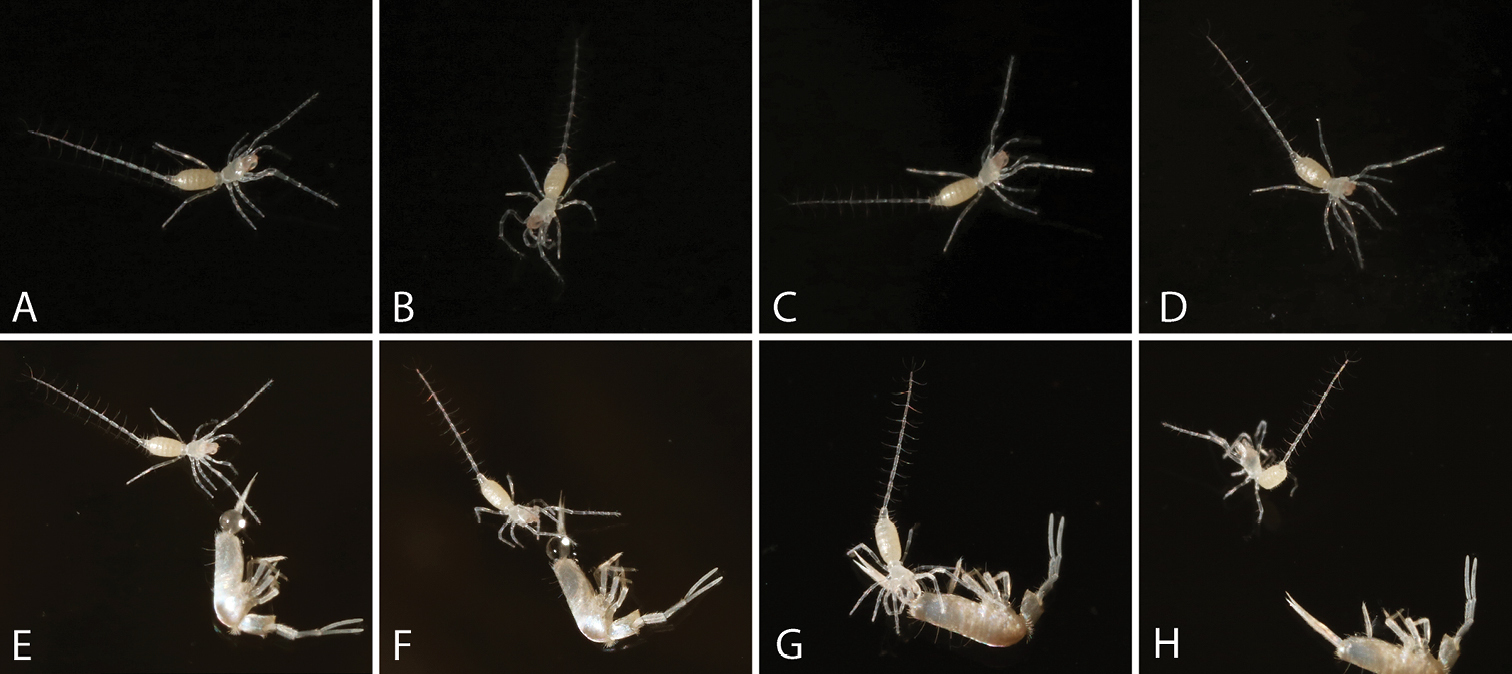

Scientific classification
- Kingdom: Animalia
- Phylum: Arthropoda
- Subphylum: Chelicerata
- Class: Arachnida
- Order: Palpigradi
- Family: Eukoeneniidae
- Genus: Eukoenenia
- Species: E. strinatii

Binomial name
- Eukoenenia strinatii (Condé, 1977)

= Eukoenenia strinatii =

Species of microwhip scorpion

Eukoenenia strinatii is a species of palpigrades, also known as microwhip scorpions, in the Eukoeneniidae family. The species is believed to only reside in the Cave of Bossea in Italy. It was last documented and verified in 2019.
