= Prokoenenia wheeleri =

Scientific classification
- Domain: Eukaryota
- Kingdom: Animalia
- Phylum: Arthropoda
- Subphylum: Chelicerata
- Class: Arachnida
- Order: Palpigradi
- Family: Prokoeneniidae
- Genus: Prokoenenia
- Species: P. wheeleri

Binomial name
- Prokoenenia wheeleri Borner, 1901

Species of microwhip scorpion

Prokoenenia wheeleri is a species of microscorpion in the family Prokoeneniidae.
