= Clelia Lollini =

Italian physician

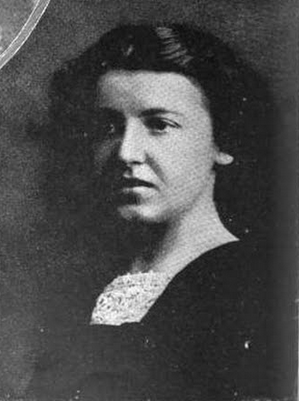
Clelia Lollini, from a 1919 publication.

Clelia Lollini (May 1, 1890 – November 24, 1963) was an Italian medical doctor. She helped to found the Medical Women's International Federation and the Italian Women's Medical Association.

== Early life ==
Clelia Lollini was born in Rome, the daughter of Vittorio Lollini and Elisa Agnini. Her father was a lawyer and her mother was a journalist and feminist. All four of the Lollini daughters (Olga, Clara, Livia, and Clelia) pursued higher education and professional careers. Clelia Lollini finished her medical degree in 1915.

== Career ==
During World War I she enlisted and worked as a surgeon at a military hospital in Venice. In 1919 she attended the YWCA's International Conference of Women Physicians in New York, where she gave a lecture on "Prostitution and Prophylaxis of Venereal Disease in Italy", and described her efforts to add social hygiene to Italian public school curricula. She also opened a prenatal clinic for unmarried women in Rome.

She became one of the founders of the Medical Women's International Federation. She and Myra Carcupino-Ferrari founded the Italian Women's Medical Association (AIDM) soon after. Her own experience of tuberculosis, including a two-year stay in a sanatorium, led to her focus on the care of tubercular patients. From 1930 to 1938 she was in charge of the Anti-Tubercular Consortium of Massa. She moved to Tripoli in 1938 and continued her work on tuberculosis there.

== Personal life and legacy ==
Clelia Lollini spoke Italian, French, German, English, and Arabic. She died in 1963, aged 73 years, in Tripoli, after an eye surgery.

Silvia Mori wrote a novel, Polveri di Luna (2014), based on Lollini's time at the anti-tubercular consortium in Massa.
