= Electrokoenenia =

Electrokoenenia Temporal range: Cenomanian ~99–94 Ma

Scientific classification
- Domain: Eukaryota
- Kingdom: Animalia
- Phylum: Arthropoda
- Subphylum: Chelicerata
- Class: Arachnida
- Order: Palpigradi
- Family: Eukoeneniidae
- Genus: Electrokoenenia; Engel & Huang, 2016
- Species: E. yaksha

Binomial name
- Electrokoenenia yaksha Engel & Huang, 2016

Extinct genus of microwhip scorpions

Electrokoenenia yaksha is a palpigrade that lived approximately 100 million years ago during the Cretaceous period. It is the first microwhip scorpion fossil from this period to be found and is currently the oldest known Palpigrade.

The palpigrade was discovered in 2016 when a specimen was found in Cretaceous (Cenomanian) Burmese amber from the Hukawng Valley in northern Myanmar. It is 1.47 millimetres (0.058 in) long, and has a yellow coloring.
