= Prokoenenia =

Scientific classification
- Domain: Eukaryota
- Kingdom: Animalia
- Phylum: Arthropoda
- Subphylum: Chelicerata
- Class: Arachnida
- Order: Palpigradi
- Family: Prokoeneniidae
- Genus: Prokoenenia; Börner, 1901

Type species
- Prokoenenia wheeleri (Rucker, 1901)

Species
- 6, see text

Genus of microwhip scorpions

Prokoenenia is a genus of Prokoeneniid microwhip scorpions, first described by Carl Julius Bernhard Börner in 1901.

== Species ==
As of September 2022, the World Palpigradi Catalog accepts the following six species:

- Prokoenenia asiatica Condé, 1994 – Thailand
- Prokoenenia californica Silvestri, 1913 – US (California)
- Prokoenenia celebica Condé, 1994 – Indonesia (Sulawesi)
- Prokoenenia chilensis (Hansen, 1901) – Chile
- Prokoenenia javanica Condé, 1990 – Indonesia (Java)
- Prokoenenia wheeleri (Rucker, 1901) – US (Texas)
