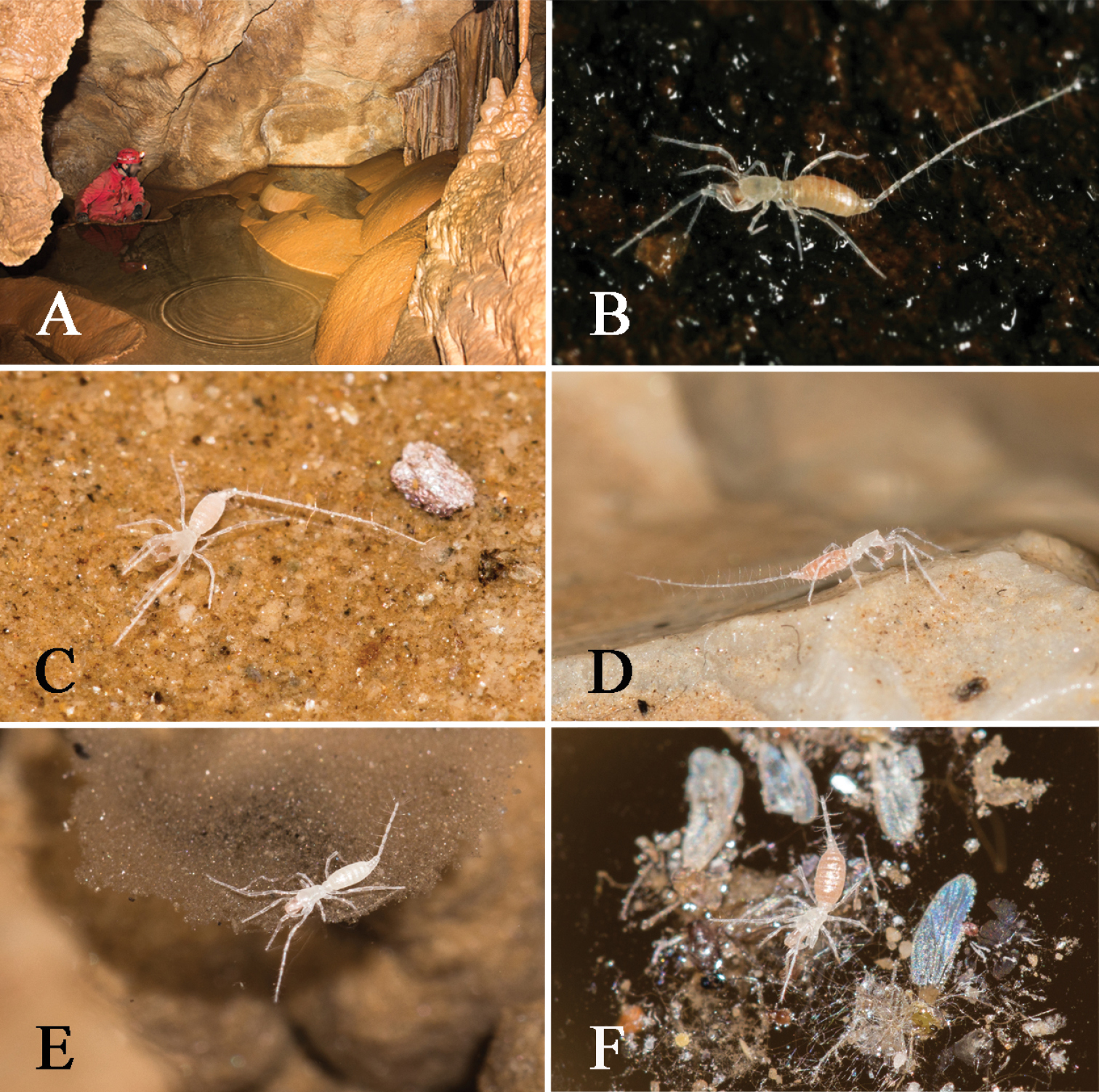
- Eukoenenia strinatii in Bossea Cave, northern Italy

Scientific classification
- Domain: Eukaryota
- Kingdom: Animalia
- Phylum: Arthropoda
- Subphylum: Chelicerata
- Class: Arachnida
- Order: Palpigradi
- Family: Eukoeneniidae
- Genus: Eukoenenia; Börner, 1901

Type species
- Eukoenenia mirabilis (Grassi & Calandruccio, 1885)

Species
- 84, see text

= Eukoenenia =

Genus of microwhip scorpions

Eukoenenia is a genus of Eukoeneniid palpigrades, also known as microwhip scorpions, which was first described by Carl Julius Bernhard Börner in 1901.

== Species ==
As of September 2022, the World Palpigradi Catalog accepted the following eighty-four species:

- Eukoenenia amatei Mayoral & Barranco, 2017 – Spain
- Eukoenenia angolensis (Rémy, 1956) – Angola
- Eukoenenia angusta (Hansen, 1901) – India, Sri Lanka, Thailand
- Eukoenenia ankaratrensis Rémy, 1960 – Madagascar
- Eukoenenia antanosa (Rémy, 1950) – Madagascar
- Eukoenenia audax Souza, Mayoral & Ferreira, 2020 – Brazil
- Eukoenenia austriaca (Hansen, 1926) – Austria, Italy, Slovenia
- Eukoenenia bara (Rémy, 1950) – Madagascar
- Eukoenenia berlesei (Silvestri, 1903) – Algeria, France, Italy, U.S. Virgin Islands
- Eukoenenia bonadonai Condé, 1979 – France, Italy
- Eukoenenia bouilloni Condé, 1980 – France
- Eukoenenia brignolii Condé, 1979 – Italy
- Eukoenenia brolemanni (Hansen, 1926) – France
- Eukoenenia chartoni (Rémy, 1950) – Madagascar, Sri Lanka
- Eukoenenia chilanga Montaño, 2012 – Mexico
- Eukoenenia christiani Condé, 1988 – Malta
- Eukoenenia condei Orghidan, Georgesco & Sârbu, 1982 – Romania
- Eukoenenia corozalensis Montaño & Francke, 2006 – Mexico
- Eukoenenia deceptrix Rémy, 1960 – Madagascar
- Eukoenenia deleta Condé, 1992 – Thailand
- Eukoenenia delphini (Rémy, 1950) – Madagascar
- Eukoenenia depilata Rémy, 1960 – Madagascar
- Eukoenenia draco (Peyerimhoff, 1906) – Spain
- Eukoenenia ferratilis Souza & Ferreira, 2011 – Brazil
- Eukoenenia florenciae (Rucker, 1903) – Argentina, Australia, Colombia, France, Nepal, Paraguay, US
- Eukoenenia fossati Rémy, 1960 – Madagascar
- Eukoenenia gadorensis Mayoral & Barranco, 2002 – Spain
- Eukoenenia gasparoi Condé, 1988 – Croatia, Italy, Slovenia
- Eukoenenia grafittii Condé & Heurtault, 1994 – Italy
- Eukoenenia grassii (Hansen, 1901) – Chile, Paraguay
- Eukoenenia guzikae Barranco & Harvey, 2008 – Australia
- Eukoenenia hanseni (Silvestri, 1913) – Argentina, Bermuda, Colombia, Egypt, Madagascar, Mauritius, Mexico, Morocco, Nepal, Réunion, US
- Eukoenenia hesperia (Rémy, 1953) – Côte d’Ivoire
- Eukoenenia hispanica (Peyerimhoff, 1908) – Spain
- Eukoenenia igrejinha Souza & Ferreira, 2019 – Brazil
- Eukoenenia improvisa Condé, 1979 – French Guiana
- Eukoenenia indalica Mayoral & Barranco, 2017 – Spain
- Eukoenenia janetscheki Condé, 1993 – Brazil
- Eukoenenia jequitai Souza & Ferreira, 2020 – Brazil
- Eukoenenia juberthiei Condé, 1974 – Greece, Lebanon
- Eukoenenia kenyana Condé, 1979 – Kenya
- Eukoenenia lanai Christian, 2014 – Italy
- Eukoenenia lauteli (Rémy, 1950) – Madagascar
- Eukoenenia lawrencei Rémy, 1957 – Papua New Guinea, South Africa
- Eukoenenia lienhardi Condé, 1989 – Brunei, Indonesia, Singapore
- Eukoenenia lundi Souza & Ferreira, 2020 – Brazil
- Eukoenenia lyrifer Condé, 1992 – Thailand
- Eukoenenia machadoi (Rémy, 1950) – Angola
- Eukoenenia madeirae Strinati & Condé, 1995 – Portugal
- Eukoenenia magna Souza & Ferreira, 2020 – Brazil
- Eukoenenia maquinensis Souza & Ferreira, 2010 – Brazil
- Eukoenenia margaretae Orghidan, Georgesco & Sârbu, 1982 – Romania
- Eukoenenia maroccana Barranco & Mayoral, 2007 – Morocco
- Eukoenenia maros Condé, 1992 – Indonesia
- Eukoenenia meridiana Rémy, 1960 – Madagascar
- Eukoenenia mirabilis (Grassi & Calandruccio, 1885) – Southern Europe, North Africa, Australia, Chile, Israel, Madagascar
- Eukoenenia montagudi Barranco & Mayoral, 2014 – Spain
- Eukoenenia naxos Condé, 1990 – Greece
- Eukoenenia necessaria Rémy, 1960 – Madagascar
- Eukoenenia orghidani Condé & Juberthie, 1981 – Cuba
- Eukoenenia patrizii (Condé, 1956) – Italy
- Eukoenenia pauli Condé, 1979 – Gabon
- Eukoenenia paulinae Condé, 1994 – Indonesia
- Eukoenenia potiguar Ferreira, Souza, Machado & Brescovit, 2011 – Brazil
- Eukoenenia pretneri Condé, 1977 – Croatia
- Eukoenenia pyrenaella Condé, 1990 – France
- Eukoenenia pyrenaica (Hansen, 1926) – France
- Eukoenenia remyi Condé, 1974 – Bosnia
- Eukoenenia roquettei (Mello-Leitão & Arlé, 1935) – Brazil
- Eukoenenia roscia Christian, 2014 – Italy
- Eukoenenia sakalava (Rémy, 1950) – Madagascar
- Eukoenenia sendrai Barranco & Mayoral, 2014 – Spain
- Eukoenenia siamensis (Hansen, 1901) – Thailand
- Eukoenenia singhi Condé, 1989 – India
- Eukoenenia spelaea (Peyerimhoff, 1902) – Austria, Croatia, France, Hungary, Italy, Slovakia
- Eukoenenia spelunca Souza & Ferreira, 2011 – Brazil
- Eukoenenia strinatii Condé, 1977 – Italy
- Eukoenenia subangusta (Silvestri, 1903) – Italy, Romania
- Eukoenenia tetraplumata Montaño, 2007 – Mexico
- Eukoenenia thais Condé, 1988 – Thailand
- Eukoenenia trehai Rémy, 1960 – Madagascar
- Eukoenenia valencianus Barranco & Mayoral, 2014 – Spain
- Eukoenenia vargovitshi Christian, 2014 – Georgia
- Eukoenenia zariquieyi (Condé, 1951) – Spain
