= Anna L. Brown =

American physician (d. 1924)

Anna L. Brown M.D.
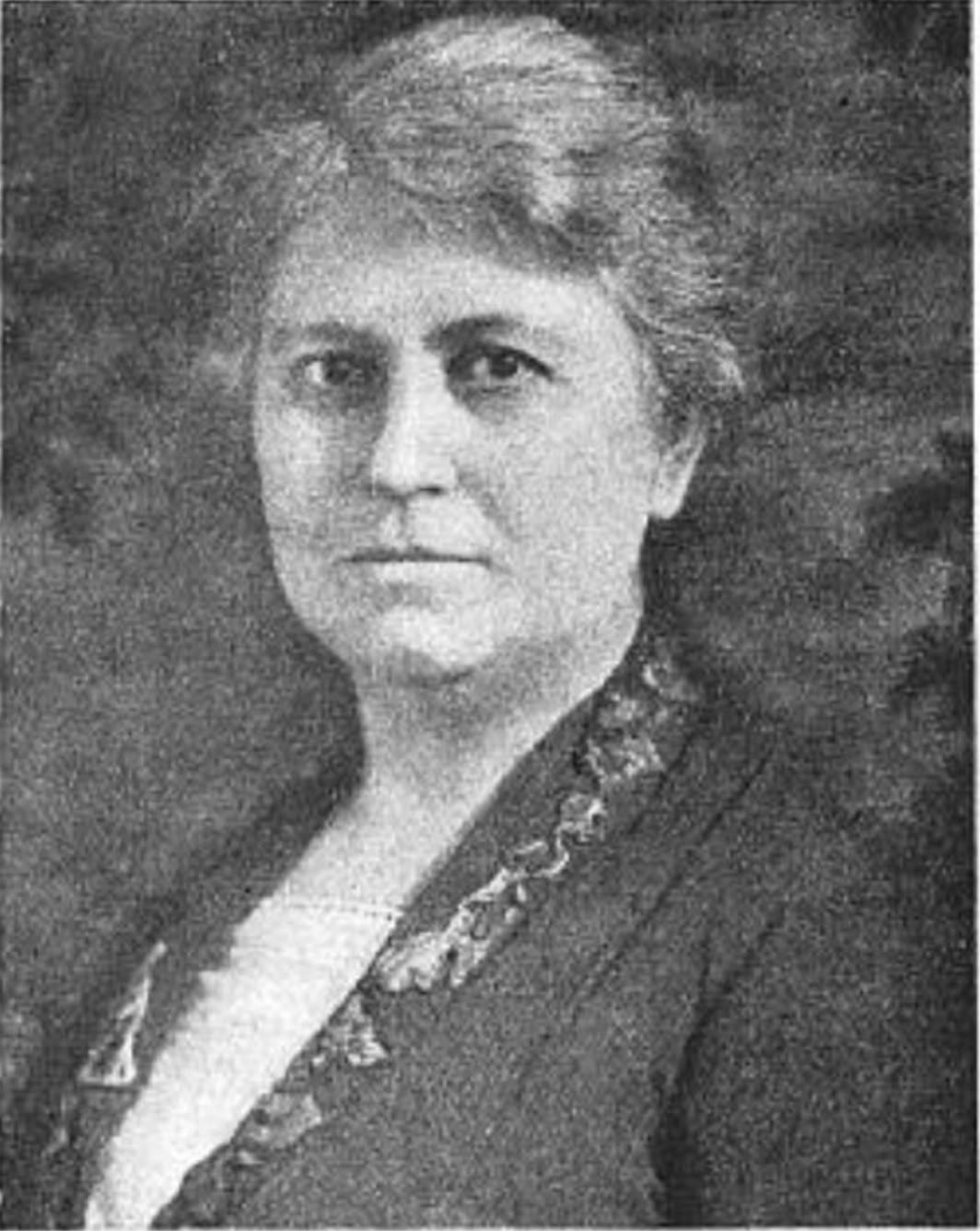
- Brown in a 1924 publication
- Born: Anna Louise Brown; Miramichi, New Brunswick, Canada
- Died: March 29, 1924; Toronto, Canada
- Burial place: Mount Royal Cemetery
- Education: Northwestern University Medical School
- Occupation: physician
- Known for: Director, Department of Health Education, National Board
- Medical career
- Institutions: YWCA
- Sub-specialties: girls' health

Anna L. Brown (died 1924) was a Canadian-born American physician. She was one of the leading authorities on the health for girls in the U.S.

== Early life and education ==
Anna Louise Brown was born in Miramichi, New Brunswick, where she was educated and lived during her early life. She had at least three siblings.

She studied medicine in Queen's University at Kingston, and Northwestern University Medical School, from which she graduated in 1892 or 1894. Brown subsequently studied at Clark University (Special Student in Psychology, 1898-99).

== Career ==
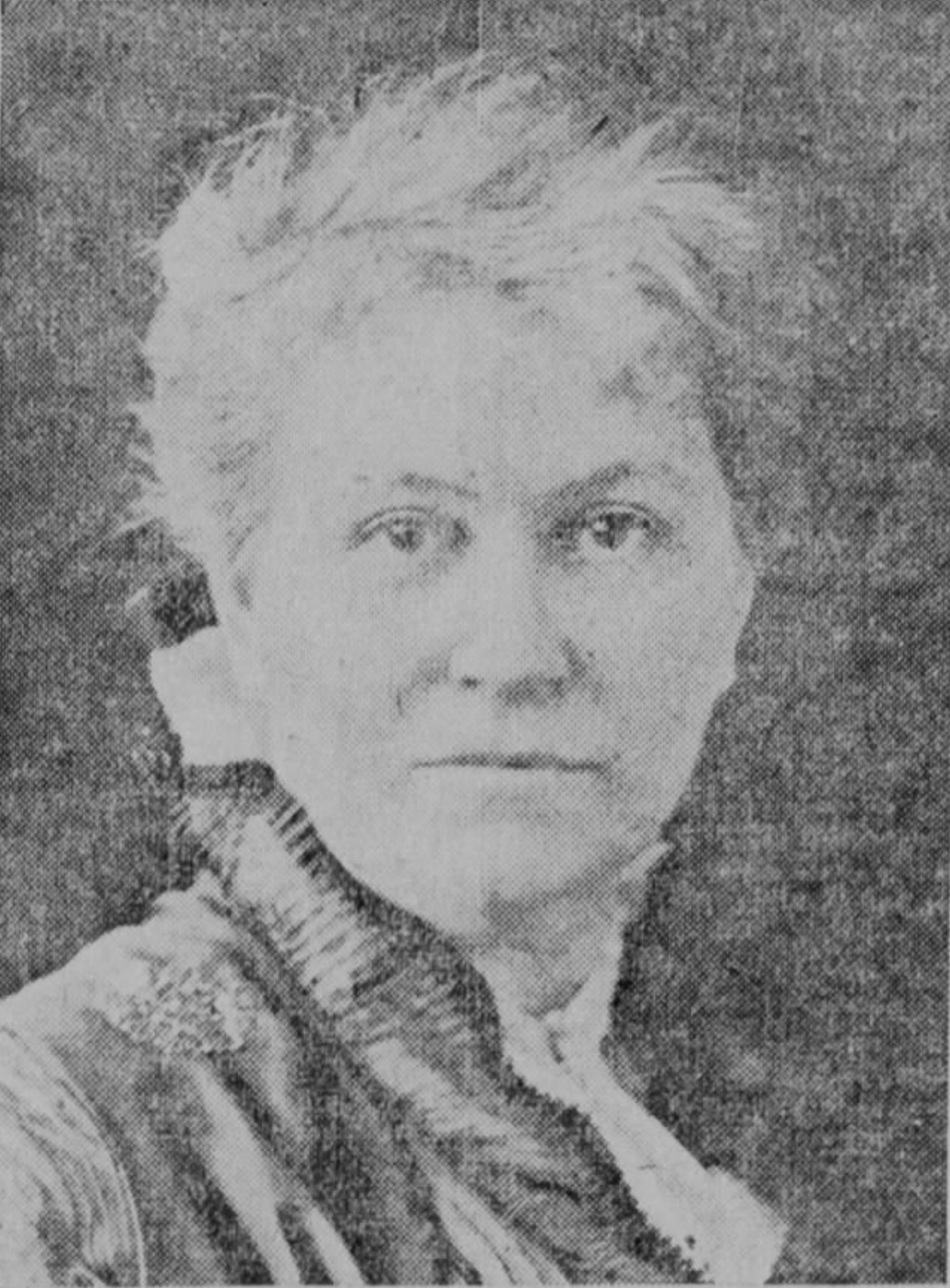
Brown in 1916

During World War I, Brown was head of the Educational Bureau of the war work council of the YWCA. In 1918, she served as the chair of the Bureau of Lecturers, Section on Women's Work, in the War Department.

In 1919, Brown served as conference chair of the International Conference of Women Physicians in New York City, delivering the opening address on September 15.

For more than twenty years, she was actively associated in YWCA work, first in Boston and later in New York City, serving as director of the Department of Health Education of the National Board.

She was the founder of the Health and Honor League, and served on the Board of Trustees of the Women's Foundation for Health.

== Death ==
While visiting her sister in Toronto at Christmas time in December 1923, Brown became ill. She died there on March 29, 1924. Interment was at Mount Royal Cemetery.

== Selected works ==
- "Association Vernacular", The Association Monthly, YWCA, August 1912
- "The Health and Honor League and Camp Fire Girls", The Association Monthly, March 1912
- "Health Tales", The Association Monthly, April 1912
- "Laws of Sex Education and Country Girls", Rural Manhood, November 1912
- "Making the Vacation Last", Woman's Home Companion, October 1924
- "Sex Education in the Young Women's Christian Association", Social Hygiene, September 1915
- "The Training of Recreation Secretaries", The Playground, April 1913
