= Tomo Inouye =

Japanese medical doctor

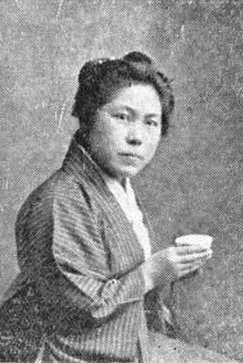
Tomo Inouye, from a 1901 publication.

Tomo Inouye (born 1870) was a Japanese medical doctor trained at the University of Michigan Medical School. She was the founder of the Japanese Medical Women's Society.

== Early life ==
Inouye was born in Fukuoka. Inouye attended a Methodist girls' school in Nagasaki, Japan.

== Education ==
Inouye began to study homeopathic medicine with an American doctor, Mary A. Gault, who was married to a Japanese man and who ran a clinic at Nagasaki. She is said to have chosen medicine because she was too short to qualify for nurses' training.

In 1898, Inouye graduated from the Cleveland Homeopathic Medical College. She was the only woman in a group of eight Japanese students enrolled at the University of Michigan in 1900. She earned her medical degree there in 1901 and received her Japanese medical license in 1903.

== Career ==
Inouye was a delegate to the fourth world conference of the Woman's Christian Temperance Union in Toronto in 1897. She returned to Japan after medical school and was a practicing physician in Tokyo. She was also appointed a medical inspector for school girls in Tokyo and taught hygiene and health classes. She was active with the YWCA of Japan.

In 1920, she revisited her alma mater with Ida Kahn, the school's first Chinese woman graduate. Both women were in the United States to attend the International Conference of Women Physicians in New York City in 1919.

Tomo Inouye founded the Japanese Medical Women's Society, and was a founding member and at-large board member of the Medical Women's International Society (MWIA) in 1919. In 1923, she headed a relief project of women physicians responding to the 1923 Great Kantō earthquake.

== Personal life ==
Inouye lived through World War II, though her home and belongings were destroyed: "All my pictures, books, instruments, specimens, and everything were burned to the ground through that terrible bomb," she wrote to Michigan friends in 1948. "Therefore I have nothing remained, no keepsake, and made homeless, no relative to look after me, separated from all my friends."
