= Leptokoenenia =

Scientific classification
- Kingdom: Animalia
- Phylum: Arthropoda
- Subphylum: Chelicerata
- Class: Arachnida
- Order: Palpigradi
- Family: Eukoeneniidae
- Genus: Leptokoenenia; Condé, 1965

Type species
- Leptokoenenia gerlachi Condé, 1965

Species
- 5, see text

Genus of microwhip scorpions

Leptokoenenia is a genus of Eukoeneniid microwhip scorpions, first described by Bruno Condé in 1965.

== Species ==
As of September 2022, the World Palpigradi Catalog accepts the following five species:

- Leptokoenenia gallii (Christian, 2009) – Italy
- Leptokoenenia gerlachi Condé, 1965 – Saudi Arabia
- Leptokoenenia pelada Souza & Ferreira, 2013 – Brazil
- Leptokoenenia scurra Monniot, 1966 – Republic of the Congo
- Leptokoenenia thalassophobica Souza & Ferreira, 2013 – Brazil
