= Eukoenenia christiani =

Scientific classification
- Kingdom: Animalia
- Phylum: Arthropoda
- Subphylum: Chelicerata
- Class: Arachnida
- Order: Palpigradi
- Family: Eukoeneniidae
- Genus: Eukoenenia
- Species: E. christiani

Binomial name
- Eukoenenia christiani Condé, 1988

Species of microwhip scorpion

Eukoenenia christiani (the Maltese palpigrade, known as Il-Palpigrad ta' Malta in Maltese) is a species in the order Palpigradi, an early-branching lineage of arachnids. There are 80 species of palpigrade worldwide. They are small and eyeless with a long tail-like structure. This species is endemic to the Maltese Islands.

== Taxonomy and naming ==
Eukoenenia christiani was first discovered in 1988 when a specimen was found in a cave in the Girgenti Valley (Malta). No sightings have been reported since then.

== Description ==
Eukoenenia christiani is 1.2 millimetres (0.047 in) long, and is depicted as having a light brown colouring.

== See also ==
- Endemic Maltese wildlife
