= Triadokoenenia =

Scientific classification
- Kingdom: Animalia
- Phylum: Arthropoda
- Subphylum: Chelicerata
- Class: Arachnida
- Order: Palpigradi
- Family: Prokoeneniidae
- Genus: Triadokoenenia; Condé, 1991
- Species: T. millotorum

Binomial name
- Triadokoenenia millotorum (Rémy, 1950)

Genus of microwhip scorpions

Triadokoenenia is a monotypic genus of Prokoeneniid microwhip scorpions, first described by Bruno Condé in 1991. Its single species, Triadokoenenia millotorum is distributed in Madagascar.
