= Eukoenenia florenciae =

Scientific classification
- Kingdom: Animalia
- Phylum: Arthropoda
- Subphylum: Chelicerata
- Class: Arachnida
- Order: Palpigradi
- Family: Eukoeneniidae
- Genus: Eukoenenia
- Species: E. florenciae

Binomial name
- Eukoenenia florenciae (Rucker, 1903)

Synonyms
- Koenenia florenciae Rucker, 1903; Koenenia buxtoni Berland, 1914

Species of microwhip scorpion

Eukoenenia florenciae is a species of palpigradess, also known as microwhip scorpions, in the Eukoeneniidae family. It was described in 1903 by American arachnologist A. Rucker.

== Distribution and habitat ==
The species has a cosmopolitan distribution. The type locality is Bonham, Fannin County, Texas, USA

== Behaviour ==
The palpigrades are soil-dwelling, terrestrial predators.
