= Allokoenenia =

Scientific classification
- Domain: Eukaryota
- Kingdom: Animalia
- Phylum: Arthropoda
- Subphylum: Chelicerata
- Class: Arachnida
- Order: Palpigradi
- Family: Eukoeneniidae
- Genus: Allokoenenia; Silvestri, 1913

Type species
- Allokoenenia afra Silvestri, 1913

Species
- 3, see text

Genus of microwhip scorpions

Allokoenenia is a genus of Eukoeneniid microwhip scorpions, first described by Filippo Silvestri in 1913.

== Species ==
As of September 2022, the World Palpigradi Catalog accepts the following three species:

- Allokoenenia afra Silvestri, 1913 – Guinea
- Allokoenenia canhembora Souza & Ferreira, 2022 – Brazil
- Allokoenenia stygia Souza & Ferreira, 2022 – Brazil
