= Alice Armand Ugón =

Uruguayan pediatrician

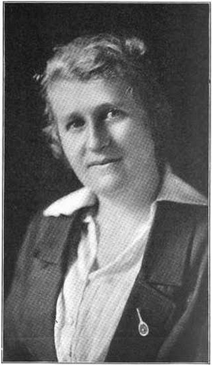
Alice Armand Ugón, from a 1919 publication.

Alice Armand Ugón Rivoir (January 15, 1887 – August 17, 1992) was an Uruguayan pediatrician, co-founder of the Sociedad Uruguaya de Pediatría.

== Early life ==
Alice Armand Ugón was born in Colonia Valdense, to parents Daniel Armand Ugon, a Waldensian pastor, and Alice Sophie Rivoir. Her parents were both of French ancestry, and both born in the Piedmont region in Italy. Several of her twelve siblings also became doctors or pharmacists; her brother Enrique Armand-Ugón was a diplomat and a judge, and her sister Ana Margarita Armand Ugón was a noted educator and feminist in Montevideo. She graduated from medical college in 1916, the fifth woman to earn her medical degree in Uruguay. (Her older sister María was the third woman doctor trained in Uruguay.)

== Career ==
Armand Ugón co-founded the Sociedad Uruguaya de Pediatría, with Luis Morquio and others. She ran a free clinic for mothers and babies in Montevideo, oversaw female students' health in the public schools of Montevideo, and taught chemistry in a girls' high school. Armand Ugón was a delegate to the International Conference of Women Physicians held in 1919 in New York City, and on the same trip was a guest of the Boston Equal Suffrage Association on a tour of several American colleges. In 1921 she published research on measles and meningitis in children. In 1922 she published her research findings on typhoid in children, and on acute aortic rheumatism.

== Personal life ==
Outside her work, Armand Ugón was a tennis champion. She died in Montevideo in 1992, aged 105 years.
