= Healthy Babies Are Happy Babies =

Childcare manual

- Author: Josephine Kenyon
- Subject: Paediatrics
- Publisher: Little, Brown and Company
- Publication date: 1934
- Publication place: USA

Healthy Babies Are Happy Babies: A Complete Handbook for Modern Mothers was a popular childcare manual by American pediatrician Josephine Kenyon first published by Little, Brown and Company in 1934.

== Background ==
The book belonged to a genre of childcare manuals pioneered by Luther Emmett Holt in 1894 with The Care and Feeding of Children. The book's popularity reflected Kenyon's appeal and perceived authority as both a mother and a physician. Over the course of its five revisions (the final two co-authored with her daughter Ruth Kenyon Russell) her advice moved from emphasizing rigid schedules to encouraging "on-demand" scheduling based on the child. The child's healthy emotional development was emphasized, as was the importance of the pre- and postnatal health of the mother.

== Reception ==
Kenyon's book was very popular, undergoing nineteen printings in the United States and five translations abroad. The book was widely praised for its practical advice and appeal to both mothers and physicians. Hazel Corbin, general director of the Maternity Center Association, enthusiastically endorsed the book, telling new mothers that "the soundest advice I can give you on baby care is to get a copy of that book."
