= Koeneniodes =

Scientific classification
- Domain: Eukaryota
- Kingdom: Animalia
- Phylum: Arthropoda
- Subphylum: Chelicerata
- Class: Arachnida
- Order: Palpigradi
- Family: Eukoeneniidae
- Genus: Koeneniodes; Silvestri, 1913

Type species
- Koeneniodes notabilis Silvestri, 1913

Species
- 8, see text

Genus of microwhip scorpions

Koeneniodes is a genus of Eukoeneniid microwhip scorpions, first described by Filippo Silvestri in 1913.

== Species ==
As of September 2022, the World Palpigradi Catalog accepts the following eight species:

- Koeneniodes berndi Condé, 1988 – Malaysia
- Koeneniodes deharvengi Condé, 1981 – Philippines
- Koeneniodes frondiger Rémy, 1950 – Indonesia, Madagascar, Mauritius, Papua New Guinea, Réunion
- Koeneniodes leclerci Condé, 1992 – Thailand
- Koeneniodes madecassus Rémy, 1950 – Hong Kong, Indonesia, Madagascar, Mauritius, Réunion, Seychelles, Sri Lanka
- Koeneniodes malagasorum Rémy, 1960 – Madagascar
- Koeneniodes notabilis Silvestri, 1913 – Guinea
- Koeneniodes spiniger Condé, 1984 – Thailand
