= Prokoeneniidae =

Scientific classification
- Kingdom: Animalia
- Phylum: Arthropoda
- Subphylum: Chelicerata
- Class: Arachnida
- Order: Palpigradi
- Family: Prokoeneniidae; Condé, 1996

Family of microwhip scorpions

Prokoeneniidae is a family of microscorpions in the order Palpigradi. There are at least two genera and about seven described species in Prokoeneniidae.

== Genera ==
- Prokoenenia Borner, 1901
- Triadokoenenia Condé, 1991
