= Caroline Colvin =

American woman historian

- Born: October 8, 1863; Webster, Indiana
- Died: November 6, 1953 (aged 90); Richmond, Indiana
- Occupation: University professor
- Known for: First woman department leader at University of Maine

Academic background
- Education: Indiana University (undergraduate); University of Pennsylvania (doctorate)

Caroline Colvin (October 8, 1863 – November 6, 1953) was an American academic. She served as chair of the History Department at the University of Maine from 1906 to 1932, making her one of the first women in the nation to head a major university department.

== Early life ==
Colvin was born in Webster, Indiana in 1863.

Colvin attended Indiana University for her undergraduate studies. She later received a doctorate degree from the University of Pennsylvania, which was rare for women at the time.

== Academic career ==
In the early 1900s, the University of Maine—bolstered by its land grant institute status—was expanding its liberal arts programs to accompany its engineering and agricultural programs. In 1902, Colvin became the first female faculty member at the university, serving as a professor of history.

Colvin was named the chair of University of Maine's Department of History and Government in 1906, making her one of the first women in the US to lead a major university department. This was groundbreaking for the time: 80% of students and faculty were men, making women a minority in academia. She became the University of Maine's first dean of women in 1923 and held the position until 1927.

As dean of women, Colvin advocated increased women's sports, and was a supporter of the Women's Student Government. She was the first ever honorary member of the All Maine Women honor society.

Colvin was awarded an honorary Doctor of Laws degree in 1927. She retired from her position as department chair in 1932 and was granted emeritus status.

== Later life and death ==
Colvin died on November 6, 1953, in Richmond, Indiana.

== Legacy ==
Colvin is the namesake of Colvin Hall, a facility used by the University of Maine Honors College. Opened in 1930, Colvin Hall was initially an all-women's dormitory before being converted to co-educational housing in the 1980s. Since 1999, Colvin Hall has been designated the Honors Building, housing the Thomson Honors Center and residence facilities for Honors students. Campus legend alleges that since the 1980s, male students in Colvin Hall have seen and heard a female ghost in the building, suspected to be Colvin herself.

In 1976, the University of Maine created the Caroline Colvin scholarship for women studying history.
