= Josephine Kenyon =

American pediatrician and health educator (1880–1965)

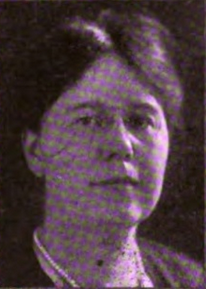
- Kenyon in 1919
- Born: Josephine Hemenway Kenyon; May 10, 1880; Auburn, New York, U.S.
- Died: January 10, 1965 (age 84); Boulder, Colorado, U.S.
- Education: Bachelor's degree, Pritchett College (1898) Master's degree, Pritchett College (1899) M.D., Johns Hopkins University School of Medicine (1904)
- Occupations: Pediatrician, health educator
- Known for: Contributions to pediatrics and public health education
- Spouse: James Henry Kenyon (m. 1911–1939)
- Children: 2 daughters

Josephine Hemenway Kenyon (May 10, 1880 – January 10, 1965) was an American pediatrician and health educator who is known for her contributions to the field of childcare and public health education in the early 20th century. She was among the earliest women to graduate from the Johns Hopkins University School of Medicine and went on to have a distinguished career as a physician, researcher, and prominent advocate for scientific motherhood.

Kenyon practiced medicine throughout her career, maintaining affiliations with several hospitals in New York, including the Neurological Institute, the New York Infirmary for Women and Children, and Bellevue Hospital. She was a member of several professional medical societies, including the American Medical Association, and a fellow of the New York Academy of Medicine.

== Biography ==
=== Early life and education ===
Josephine Hemenway Kenyon was born on May 10, 1880, in Auburn, New York. (Note: The New York Times reported her birthplace to be Glasgow, MO. However, most sources, such as the American National Biography denotes that she was born in Auburn, NY, and moved to Glasgow with her family when she was 11 years old.) She was the daughter of Charles Carroll Hemenway, a Presbyterian minister, and Ida Eliza Shackelford. When Kenyon was eleven years old, the family moved to Glasgow, Missouri, where her father became the president of Pritchett College. Kenyon studied at Pritchett, receiving a bachelor's degree in 1898 and a master's degree in 1899.

In 1899, Kenyon moved to Philadelphia and studied biology under Thomas Hunt Morgan at Bryn Mawr College to work towards a career in medicine. In 1900, she became a student at the School of Medicine at Johns Hopkins University in Baltimore, where she received education under physicians who included William Henry Welch, Sir William Osler, William Stewart Halsted, and Howard Atwood Kelly. In 1904, Kenyon was one of three women who graduated in a class of forty-five people, some of the earliest women who graduated from the medical school.

=== Medical career ===
Upon graduating, Kenyon won a competitive internship as a medical officer at the Johns Hopkins University Hospital, which she held for a year. In 1905, she began the first of six years as a resident at the Babies' Hospital of New York City, one of the first U.S. institutions exclusively dealing with the care of infants below the age of three. During her residency, Kenyon conducted research on influenza and meningitis diseases of children with the hospital's chief physician, Luther Emmett Holt, considered a founding father of pediatrics in the United States, and Martha Wollstein, another resident who later became a notable medical researcher at the Rockefeller Institute.

Following her residency, Kenyon opened her own private practice in pediatrics in New York City. In 1911, she married James Henry Kenyon, a neurosurgeon at Babies' Hospital. The couple had two daughters.

=== Educator and public health advocate ===
Kenyon also began to work as an educator on topics relating to childcare, social hygiene, and sex education. By 1909, she was giving special lectures at Teachers College, Columbia University, and in 1913 she was appointed there to the position of lecturer, which she held for twenty-four years. Kenyon initiated a course in childcare, on the recommendation of Holt, who described her as "the best man I ever had on my staff." She also lectured on topics relating to health education and social hygiene, which were intended to deter prostitution and the transmission of venereal disease.

Kenyon assisted social reform organizations concerned with public health work, including the Presbyterian Church in the U.S.A. Board of National Missions, the New York Diet Kitchen, and the national board of the Young Women's Christian Associations (YWCA). In her work for the YWCA, she organized a nationwide lecture series, with presentations from women physicians, to address audiences of young women. During World War I, she organized a series of lectures to address the proper sexual conduct of women dealing with soldiers. She served as the acting director of the Women's Work Section of the Social Hygiene Division for the Commission on Training Camp Activities of the U.S. War Department.

In 1921 Kenyon's work with the YWCA board ended. In 1922, she took on a new role in public health education. She accepted a position with Good Housekeeping that situated her as a popular scientific authority. Kenyon directed the Health and Happiness Club, a correspondence service for expectant mothers that sent them letters on prenatal and later infant care. By 1923, Kenyon was writing monthly columns for the magazine, focusing on problems of infant care brought up by the club's members.

=== Author and pediatric advisor ===
In 1934, Kenyon wrote Healthy Babies Are Happy Babies: A Complete Handbook for Modern Mothers. The book belonged to a genre of childcare manuals pioneered by Holt in 1894 with The Care and Feeding of Children. Kenyon's book was very popular, undergoing nineteen printings in the United States and five translations abroad. The book's popularity reflected Kenyon's appeal and perceived authority as both a mother and a physician. Over the course of its five revisions (the final two co-authored with her daughter Ruth Kenyon Russell) her advice moved from emphasizing rigid schedules to encouraging "on-demand" scheduling based on the child. The child's healthy emotional development was emphasized, as was the importance of the pre- and postnatal health of the mother.

The book was widely praised for its practical advice and appeal to both mothers and physicians. Hazel Corbin, general director of the Maternity Center Association, enthusiastically endorsed the book, telling new mothers that "the soundest advice I can give you on baby care is to get a copy of that book."

== Later life and legacy ==
Kenyon's mother, Ida Shackelford, moved in with her in 1933. Kenyon's husband died in 1939. Her mother died on October 14, 1940, after a long-term illness. In 1950, Kenyon closed her pediatric practice and moved to Boulder, Colorado, to live near her daughters and their families. She continued writing for Good Housekeeping until 1952. Kenyon died in Boulder on January 10, 1965, at the age of 84.

== Sources ==
=== Books ===
- Opitz, Donald L. (February 2000). "Kenyon, Josephine Hemenway". American National Biography. New York: Oxford University Press. doi:10.1093/anb/9780198606697.article.1200480. (subscription required)
