= Lolita Coffin Van Rensselaer =

American clubwoman

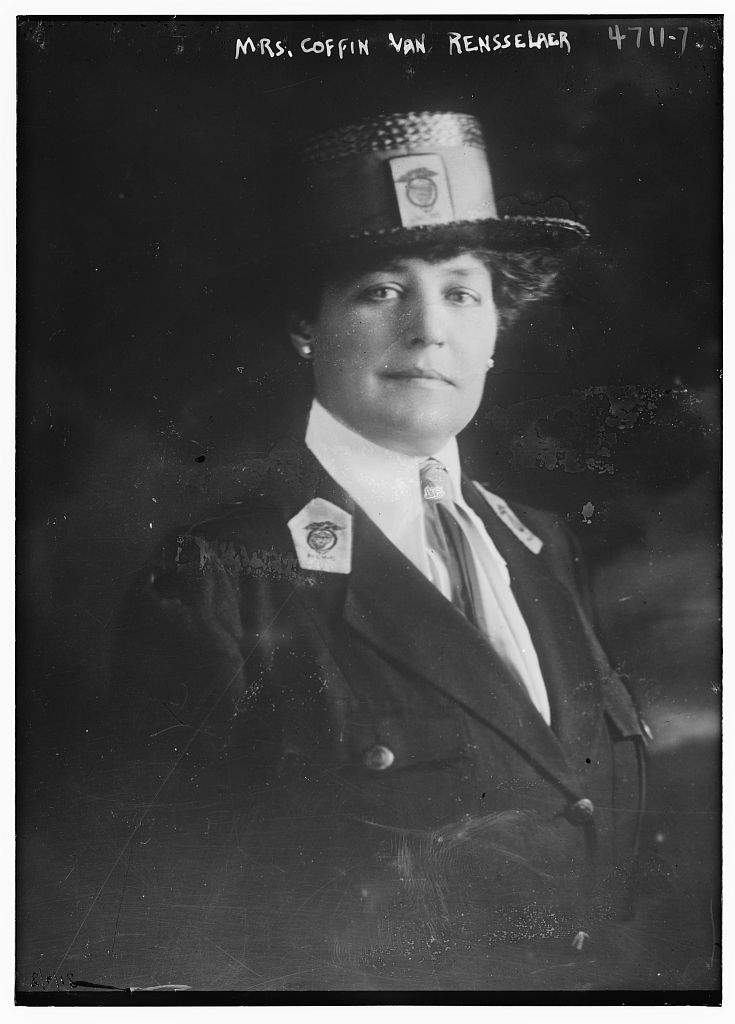
- Lolita Coffin Van Rensselaer in the 1910s
- Born: Lolita Adela Coffin; November 1, 1875; Irvington, New York
- Died: January 10, 1947 (aged 71); New York City
- Occupations: Clubwoman, activist
- Spouse: Lyndsay Van Rensselaer

Lolita Adela Coffin Van Rensselaer (November 1, 1875 – January 10, 1947) was an American clubwoman and activist. Among her national leadership roles, she was vice-chair of the National League for Women's Service during World War I, and worked with Pauline Sabin on the Women's Organization for National Prohibition Reform (WONPR), an anti-temperance women's organization formed in 1932.

== Early life and education ==
Coffin was born in Irvington, New York, the daughter of Joseph Wilbur Coffin and Lolita Frances Taft Coffin.

== Career ==
During World War I, Van Rensselaer was the vice chair of the National League for Women's Service. "Mrs. Van Rensselaer spoke clearly and distinctly and really has a military bearing," reported a Tennessee newspaper in 1917. She toured England and France in 1919, speaking with refugees and women war workers. "None of us wish another conflict in which our very hearts were involved, as well as the safety of this country," she told a San Francisco audience in 1927. "But it is my opinion that women will always rise to the needs of this nation and of the American people."

After the war, Van Renssellaer was executive secretary of the Women's Department of the National Civic Federation of New York. She was a member of the General Committee on the Limitation of Armament when it formed in 1921.

In 1926 Van Rensselaer was on the campaign committee to re-elect James W. Wadsworth Jr. to the Senate. She was a prominent member of the anti-temperance Women's Organization for National Prohibition Reform (WONPR). and a member of the board of governors of the Women's National Republican Club. In 1930 she addressed the School of Politics of the Women's National Republican Club, saying, "I think that we have assumed a semi-jocular attitude toward Congress that is ill-justified."

== Publications ==
- "Prison Reform of the Woman's Department National Civic Federation" (1917)
- "The National League for Woman's Service" (1918)

== Personal life ==
Coffin married Lyndsay Van Rensselaer in 1897. They had a daughter, Catharine. Her husband died in 1928, and she died in 1947, at the age of 71, in New York City.
