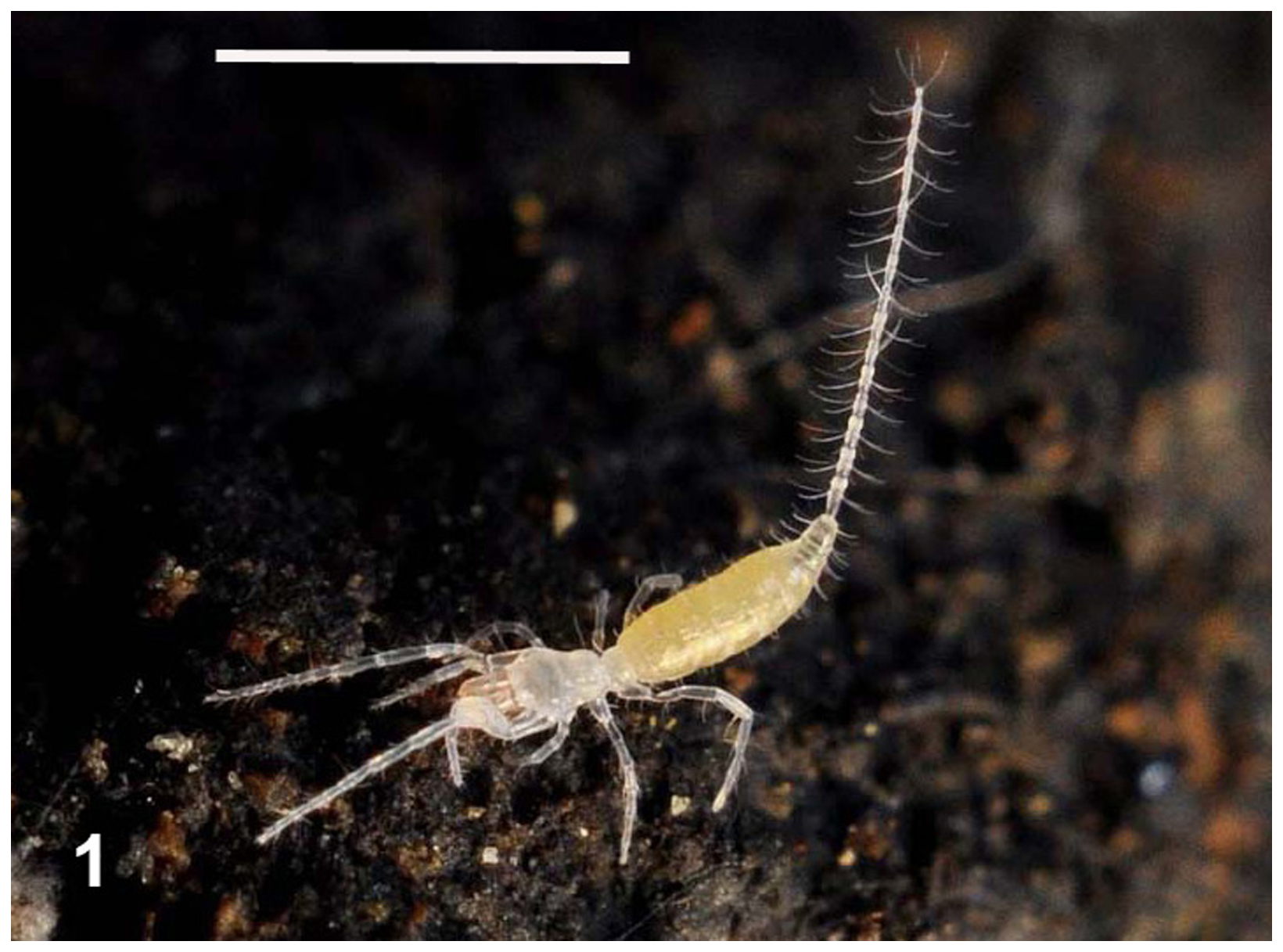
- Eukoenenia spelaea

Scientific classification
- Kingdom: Animalia
- Phylum: Arthropoda
- Subphylum: Chelicerata
- Class: Arachnida
- Order: Palpigradi; Thorell, 1888

Families
- Eukoeneniidae; Prokoeneniidae

Synonyms
- Microthelyphonida; Palpigradida

= Palpigradi =

Palpigradi Temporal range: Cenomanian–Recent

Order of arachnids known as microwhip scorpions

Palpigradi is an order of very small arachnids commonly known as microwhip scorpion or palpigrades.

== Description ==
Palpigrades belong to the arachnid class. They are the sister group to Solifugae, no more than 3 mm (0.12 in) in length, and averaging 1–1.5 mm (0.04–0.06 in). They have a thin, pale, segmented integument, and a segmented abdomen that terminates in a whip-like flagellum. This is made up of 15 segment-like parts, or "articles", and may make up as much as half the animal's length. Each article of the flagellum bears bristles, giving the whole flagellum the appearance of a bottle brush. The carapace is divided into two plates between the third and fourth leg pair of legs. They have no eyes.

As in some other arachnids, the first pair of legs is modified to serve as sensory organs, and are held clear of the ground while walking. Often, however, palpigrades use their pedipalps for locomotion, so that the animal appears to be walking on five pairs of legs. But they do not swing in phase with the walking legs, and are mostly used as legs in rough terrain. Both the nine-segmented pedipalps and the four pairs of legs end in three claws each. The first pair of legs are 11-segmented, the second and third pairs seven-segmented and the fourth pair eight-segmented.

The family Prokoeneniidae have three pairs of lung-sacs on the fourth, fifth and sixth abdominal segments, although these are not true book lungs as there is no trace of the characteristic leaflike lamellae which defines book lungs. Family Eukoeneniidae have no respiratory organs at all and breathe directly through the cuticle.

Their exoskeleton is very weakly sclerotized compared to other arachnids, which is the reason why fossils are so rare, and go no further back than 99 million years ago in Burmese Amber. A hydrophobic epicuticular layer, which is secreted by most arachnids, is absent.

== Ecology and behavior ==
Species of Palpigradi live interstitially in wet tropical and subtropical soils. A few species have been found in shallow coral sands and on tropical beaches. In Europe, they have been found in caves and underground spaces. There is one endemic species on the island of Malta, in the Mediterranean Sea, which exists only in one specific cave. They need a damp environment to survive, and they always hide from light, so they are commonly found in the moist earth under buried stones and rocks. They can be found on every continent, except in Arctic and Antarctic regions. Terrestrial Palpigradi have hydrophobic cuticles, but littoral (beach-dwelling) species are able to pass through the water surface easily.

Very little is known about palpigrade behavior. They are generally believed to be predators like their larger relatives, feeding on minuscule animals in their habitat. However, their chelicerae have been described as "more like a comb or brush than the forceps of a predator", and the species Eukoenenia spelaea has been shown to feed on cyanobacteria ("blue-green algae"). Their mating habits are unknown, except that they lay only a few relatively large eggs at a time.

== Classification ==
Palpigradi is split into two families, differentiated by the presence of ventral sacs on sternites IV–VI in Prokoeneniidae, and their absence in Eukoeneniidae.

Two fossil palpigrade species have been described. The first one is from the Onyx Marble of Arizona, which is probably of Pliocene age. Its familial position is uncertain. The second one (Electrokoenenia yaksha), belonging to the family Eukoeneniidae, is known from Cretaceous (Cenomanian) Burmese amber from northern Myanmar. Older publications refer to a fossil palpigrade (or palpigrade-like animal) from the Jurassic of the Solnhofen limestone in Germany, but this has now been shown to be a misidentified fossil insect.

=== Genera ===
As of September 2022, the World Palpigradi Catalog accepts the following eight genera:

- Allokoenenia Silvestri, 1913
- Eukoenenia Börner, 1901
- Koeneniodes Silvestri, 1913
- Leptokoenenia Condé, 1965
- Prokoenenia Börner, 1901
- Triadokoenenia Condé, 1991
- †Electrokoenenia Engel & Huang, 2016
- †Paleokoenenia Rowland & Sissom, 1980

== See also ==
- Maltese palpigrade
