= Pseudanisentomon cangshanense =

Scientific classification
- Domain: Eukaryota
- Kingdom: Animalia
- Phylum: Arthropoda
- Order: Protura
- Family: Eosentomidae
- Genus: Pseudanisentomon
- Species: P. cangshanense

Binomial name
- Pseudanisentomon cangshanense Imadaté, Yin & Xie, 1995

Species of arthropods

Pseudanisentomon cangshanense is a species of proturan in the family Eosentomidae. It is found in Southern Asia.
