= Pseudanisentomon =

Scientific classification
- Domain: Eukaryota
- Kingdom: Animalia
- Phylum: Arthropoda
- Order: Protura
- Family: Eosentomidae
- Genus: Pseudanisentomon; Zhang & Yin, 1984

Genus of insect-like animals

Pseudanisentomon is a genus of proturans in the family Eosentomidae. It was described by Zhang and Yin in 1984.

== Species ==
- Pseudanisentomon babai (Imadaté, 1964)
- Pseudanisentomon cangshanense Imadaté, Yin & Xie, 1995
- Pseudanisentomon dolichempodium (Yin & Zhang, 1982)
- Pseudanisentomon guangxinicum (Yin & Zhang, 1982)
- Pseudanisentomon huichouense Zhang & Yin, 1984
- Pseudanisentomon ishii Nakamura, 1996
- Pseudanisentomon jiangxiensis Yin, 1987
- Pseudanisentomon meihwa (Yin, 1965)
- Pseudanisentomon minystigmum (Yin, 1979)
- Pseudanisentomon molykos Zhang & Yin, 1984
- Pseudanisentomon paurophthalmum Zhang & Yin, 1984
- Pseudanisentomon pedanempodium (Zhang & Yin, 1981)
- Pseudanisentomon sheshanensis (Yin, 1965)
- Pseudanisentomon sininotiale Zhang & Yin, 1984
- Pseudanisentomon songkiangense Yin, 1977
- Pseudanisentomon trilinum (Zhang & Yin, 1981)
- Pseudanisentomon wanense Zhang, 1987
- Pseudanisentomon yaoshanense Zhang & Yin, 1984
- Pseudanisentomon yongxingense Yin, 1988
