= Pseudanisentomon dolichempodium =

Scientific classification
- Domain: Eukaryota
- Kingdom: Animalia
- Phylum: Arthropoda
- Order: Protura
- Family: Eosentomidae
- Genus: Pseudanisentomon
- Species: P. dolichempodium

Binomial name
- Pseudanisentomon dolichempodium (Yin & Zhang, 1982)

Species of insect-like animal

Pseudanisentomon dolichempodium is a species of proturan in the family Eosentomidae. It is found in Southern Asia.
