= Pseudanisentomon sininotiale =

Scientific classification
- Domain: Eukaryota
- Kingdom: Animalia
- Phylum: Arthropoda
- Order: Protura
- Family: Eosentomidae
- Genus: Pseudanisentomon
- Species: P. sininotiale

Binomial name
- Pseudanisentomon sininotiale Zhang & Yin, 1984

Species of insect-like animal

Pseudanisentomon sininotiale is a species of proturan in the family Eosentomidae. It is found in Southern Asia.
