= Pseudanisentomon meihwa =

Scientific classification
- Kingdom: Animalia
- Phylum: Arthropoda
- Class: Entognatha
- Order: Protura
- Family: Eosentomidae
- Genus: Pseudanisentomon
- Species: P. meihwa

Binomial name
- Pseudanisentomon meihwa (Yin, 1965)

Species of insect-like animal

Pseudanisentomon meihwa is a species of proturan in the family Eosentomidae. It is found in Southern Asia.
