= Pseudanisentomon pedanempodium =

Scientific classification
- Domain: Eukaryota
- Kingdom: Animalia
- Phylum: Arthropoda
- Order: Protura
- Family: Eosentomidae
- Genus: Pseudanisentomon
- Species: P. pedanempodium

Binomial name
- Pseudanisentomon pedanempodium (Zhang & Yin, 1981)

Species of insect-like animal

Pseudanisentomon pedanempodium is a species of proturan in the family Eosentomidae. It is found in Southern Asia.
