= Pseudanisentomon songkiangense =

Scientific classification
- Domain: Eukaryota
- Kingdom: Animalia
- Phylum: Arthropoda
- Order: Protura
- Family: Eosentomidae
- Genus: Pseudanisentomon
- Species: P. songkiangense

Binomial name
- Pseudanisentomon songkiangense (Yin, 1977)

Species of insect-like animal

Pseudanisentomon songkiangense is a species of proturan in the family Eosentomidae. It is found in Southern Asia.
